

68001–68100 

|-bgcolor=#fefefe
| 68001 ||  || — || December 4, 2000 || Socorro || LINEAR || V || align=right | 2.4 km || 
|-id=002 bgcolor=#d6d6d6
| 68002 ||  || — || December 4, 2000 || Socorro || LINEAR || — || align=right | 10 km || 
|-id=003 bgcolor=#E9E9E9
| 68003 ||  || — || December 4, 2000 || Socorro || LINEAR || MAR || align=right | 3.0 km || 
|-id=004 bgcolor=#fefefe
| 68004 ||  || — || December 5, 2000 || Socorro || LINEAR || — || align=right | 2.7 km || 
|-id=005 bgcolor=#fefefe
| 68005 ||  || — || December 4, 2000 || Socorro || LINEAR || — || align=right | 3.5 km || 
|-id=006 bgcolor=#fefefe
| 68006 ||  || — || December 4, 2000 || Socorro || LINEAR || — || align=right | 2.4 km || 
|-id=007 bgcolor=#fefefe
| 68007 ||  || — || December 6, 2000 || Socorro || LINEAR || V || align=right | 1.9 km || 
|-id=008 bgcolor=#fefefe
| 68008 ||  || — || December 5, 2000 || Haleakala || NEAT || FLO || align=right | 2.1 km || 
|-id=009 bgcolor=#fefefe
| 68009 ||  || — || December 21, 2000 || Zeno || T. Stafford || — || align=right | 2.6 km || 
|-id=010 bgcolor=#fefefe
| 68010 ||  || — || December 20, 2000 || Socorro || LINEAR || FLO || align=right | 1.6 km || 
|-id=011 bgcolor=#fefefe
| 68011 ||  || — || December 20, 2000 || Socorro || LINEAR || V || align=right | 1.9 km || 
|-id=012 bgcolor=#E9E9E9
| 68012 ||  || — || December 20, 2000 || Socorro || LINEAR || — || align=right | 5.2 km || 
|-id=013 bgcolor=#E9E9E9
| 68013 ||  || — || December 21, 2000 || Socorro || LINEAR || — || align=right | 2.8 km || 
|-id=014 bgcolor=#d6d6d6
| 68014 ||  || — || December 20, 2000 || Socorro || LINEAR || ALA || align=right | 12 km || 
|-id=015 bgcolor=#fefefe
| 68015 ||  || — || December 22, 2000 || Socorro || LINEAR || — || align=right | 1.8 km || 
|-id=016 bgcolor=#E9E9E9
| 68016 ||  || — || December 22, 2000 || Socorro || LINEAR || MAR || align=right | 3.0 km || 
|-id=017 bgcolor=#E9E9E9
| 68017 ||  || — || December 22, 2000 || Socorro || LINEAR || — || align=right | 2.3 km || 
|-id=018 bgcolor=#fefefe
| 68018 ||  || — || December 25, 2000 || Oaxaca || J. M. Roe || — || align=right | 1.7 km || 
|-id=019 bgcolor=#fefefe
| 68019 ||  || — || December 22, 2000 || Anderson Mesa || LONEOS || — || align=right | 2.3 km || 
|-id=020 bgcolor=#fefefe
| 68020 ||  || — || December 28, 2000 || Fountain Hills || C. W. Juels || — || align=right | 2.4 km || 
|-id=021 bgcolor=#fefefe
| 68021 Taiki ||  ||  || December 29, 2000 || Bisei SG Center || BATTeRS || NYS || align=right | 1.7 km || 
|-id=022 bgcolor=#E9E9E9
| 68022 ||  || — || December 21, 2000 || Socorro || LINEAR || — || align=right | 3.7 km || 
|-id=023 bgcolor=#d6d6d6
| 68023 ||  || — || December 21, 2000 || Socorro || LINEAR || ALA || align=right | 11 km || 
|-id=024 bgcolor=#fefefe
| 68024 ||  || — || December 22, 2000 || Needville || Needville Obs. || — || align=right | 2.5 km || 
|-id=025 bgcolor=#fefefe
| 68025 ||  || — || December 29, 2000 || Desert Beaver || W. K. Y. Yeung || — || align=right | 3.3 km || 
|-id=026 bgcolor=#d6d6d6
| 68026 ||  || — || December 28, 2000 || Kitt Peak || Spacewatch || THM || align=right | 7.8 km || 
|-id=027 bgcolor=#E9E9E9
| 68027 ||  || — || December 28, 2000 || Socorro || LINEAR || — || align=right | 2.4 km || 
|-id=028 bgcolor=#E9E9E9
| 68028 ||  || — || December 26, 2000 || Haleakala || NEAT || EUN || align=right | 2.5 km || 
|-id=029 bgcolor=#d6d6d6
| 68029 ||  || — || December 26, 2000 || Haleakala || NEAT || TIR || align=right | 5.6 km || 
|-id=030 bgcolor=#E9E9E9
| 68030 ||  || — || December 29, 2000 || Haleakala || NEAT || — || align=right | 8.3 km || 
|-id=031 bgcolor=#FFC2E0
| 68031 ||  || — || December 24, 2000 || Haleakala || NEAT || AMO +1km || align=right data-sort-value="0.86" | 860 m || 
|-id=032 bgcolor=#d6d6d6
| 68032 ||  || — || December 26, 2000 || Kitt Peak || Spacewatch || BRA || align=right | 3.2 km || 
|-id=033 bgcolor=#fefefe
| 68033 ||  || — || December 30, 2000 || Socorro || LINEAR || — || align=right | 1.9 km || 
|-id=034 bgcolor=#fefefe
| 68034 ||  || — || December 28, 2000 || Socorro || LINEAR || — || align=right | 2.2 km || 
|-id=035 bgcolor=#E9E9E9
| 68035 ||  || — || December 28, 2000 || Socorro || LINEAR || EUN || align=right | 2.6 km || 
|-id=036 bgcolor=#E9E9E9
| 68036 ||  || — || December 30, 2000 || Socorro || LINEAR || — || align=right | 5.0 km || 
|-id=037 bgcolor=#fefefe
| 68037 ||  || — || December 30, 2000 || Socorro || LINEAR || — || align=right | 2.0 km || 
|-id=038 bgcolor=#E9E9E9
| 68038 ||  || — || December 30, 2000 || Socorro || LINEAR || — || align=right | 6.0 km || 
|-id=039 bgcolor=#E9E9E9
| 68039 ||  || — || December 30, 2000 || Socorro || LINEAR || — || align=right | 6.0 km || 
|-id=040 bgcolor=#fefefe
| 68040 ||  || — || December 30, 2000 || Socorro || LINEAR || FLO || align=right | 1.6 km || 
|-id=041 bgcolor=#fefefe
| 68041 ||  || — || December 30, 2000 || Socorro || LINEAR || FLO || align=right | 1.6 km || 
|-id=042 bgcolor=#fefefe
| 68042 ||  || — || December 30, 2000 || Socorro || LINEAR || — || align=right | 5.6 km || 
|-id=043 bgcolor=#fefefe
| 68043 ||  || — || December 30, 2000 || Socorro || LINEAR || — || align=right | 1.9 km || 
|-id=044 bgcolor=#fefefe
| 68044 ||  || — || December 30, 2000 || Socorro || LINEAR || — || align=right | 2.3 km || 
|-id=045 bgcolor=#E9E9E9
| 68045 ||  || — || December 30, 2000 || Socorro || LINEAR || MAR || align=right | 3.1 km || 
|-id=046 bgcolor=#fefefe
| 68046 ||  || — || December 30, 2000 || Socorro || LINEAR || NYS || align=right | 2.1 km || 
|-id=047 bgcolor=#fefefe
| 68047 ||  || — || December 30, 2000 || Socorro || LINEAR || — || align=right | 2.5 km || 
|-id=048 bgcolor=#fefefe
| 68048 ||  || — || December 30, 2000 || Socorro || LINEAR || NYS || align=right | 1.8 km || 
|-id=049 bgcolor=#fefefe
| 68049 ||  || — || December 30, 2000 || Socorro || LINEAR || — || align=right | 2.5 km || 
|-id=050 bgcolor=#fefefe
| 68050 ||  || — || December 30, 2000 || Socorro || LINEAR || — || align=right | 5.8 km || 
|-id=051 bgcolor=#fefefe
| 68051 ||  || — || December 30, 2000 || Socorro || LINEAR || — || align=right | 2.4 km || 
|-id=052 bgcolor=#fefefe
| 68052 ||  || — || December 30, 2000 || Socorro || LINEAR || MAS || align=right | 2.0 km || 
|-id=053 bgcolor=#fefefe
| 68053 ||  || — || December 30, 2000 || Socorro || LINEAR || NYS || align=right | 1.7 km || 
|-id=054 bgcolor=#fefefe
| 68054 ||  || — || December 30, 2000 || Socorro || LINEAR || NYS || align=right | 1.9 km || 
|-id=055 bgcolor=#fefefe
| 68055 ||  || — || December 30, 2000 || Socorro || LINEAR || — || align=right | 1.8 km || 
|-id=056 bgcolor=#fefefe
| 68056 ||  || — || December 30, 2000 || Socorro || LINEAR || NYS || align=right | 1.6 km || 
|-id=057 bgcolor=#d6d6d6
| 68057 ||  || — || December 30, 2000 || Socorro || LINEAR || — || align=right | 8.7 km || 
|-id=058 bgcolor=#fefefe
| 68058 ||  || — || December 30, 2000 || Socorro || LINEAR || NYS || align=right | 1.9 km || 
|-id=059 bgcolor=#d6d6d6
| 68059 ||  || — || December 30, 2000 || Socorro || LINEAR || — || align=right | 9.1 km || 
|-id=060 bgcolor=#d6d6d6
| 68060 ||  || — || December 30, 2000 || Socorro || LINEAR || URS || align=right | 9.3 km || 
|-id=061 bgcolor=#fefefe
| 68061 ||  || — || December 30, 2000 || Socorro || LINEAR || — || align=right | 1.6 km || 
|-id=062 bgcolor=#E9E9E9
| 68062 ||  || — || December 28, 2000 || Kitt Peak || Spacewatch || — || align=right | 4.1 km || 
|-id=063 bgcolor=#FFC2E0
| 68063 ||  || — || December 30, 2000 || Kitt Peak || Spacewatch || AMO +1kmmoonfast || align=right | 2.3 km || 
|-id=064 bgcolor=#fefefe
| 68064 ||  || — || December 28, 2000 || Socorro || LINEAR || — || align=right | 3.0 km || 
|-id=065 bgcolor=#E9E9E9
| 68065 ||  || — || December 28, 2000 || Socorro || LINEAR || — || align=right | 3.2 km || 
|-id=066 bgcolor=#fefefe
| 68066 ||  || — || December 30, 2000 || Socorro || LINEAR || NYS || align=right | 1.5 km || 
|-id=067 bgcolor=#E9E9E9
| 68067 ||  || — || December 30, 2000 || Socorro || LINEAR || HNS || align=right | 3.7 km || 
|-id=068 bgcolor=#fefefe
| 68068 ||  || — || December 30, 2000 || Socorro || LINEAR || — || align=right | 2.8 km || 
|-id=069 bgcolor=#fefefe
| 68069 ||  || — || December 30, 2000 || Socorro || LINEAR || — || align=right | 2.4 km || 
|-id=070 bgcolor=#d6d6d6
| 68070 ||  || — || December 30, 2000 || Socorro || LINEAR || URS || align=right | 5.7 km || 
|-id=071 bgcolor=#fefefe
| 68071 ||  || — || December 30, 2000 || Socorro || LINEAR || — || align=right | 1.9 km || 
|-id=072 bgcolor=#fefefe
| 68072 ||  || — || December 30, 2000 || Socorro || LINEAR || — || align=right | 1.9 km || 
|-id=073 bgcolor=#fefefe
| 68073 ||  || — || December 30, 2000 || Socorro || LINEAR || — || align=right | 2.4 km || 
|-id=074 bgcolor=#fefefe
| 68074 ||  || — || December 30, 2000 || Socorro || LINEAR || — || align=right | 3.5 km || 
|-id=075 bgcolor=#fefefe
| 68075 ||  || — || December 30, 2000 || Socorro || LINEAR || NYS || align=right | 6.4 km || 
|-id=076 bgcolor=#fefefe
| 68076 ||  || — || December 30, 2000 || Socorro || LINEAR || NYS || align=right | 2.1 km || 
|-id=077 bgcolor=#E9E9E9
| 68077 ||  || — || December 30, 2000 || Socorro || LINEAR || — || align=right | 4.8 km || 
|-id=078 bgcolor=#d6d6d6
| 68078 ||  || — || December 30, 2000 || Socorro || LINEAR || — || align=right | 5.7 km || 
|-id=079 bgcolor=#E9E9E9
| 68079 ||  || — || December 30, 2000 || Socorro || LINEAR || — || align=right | 2.3 km || 
|-id=080 bgcolor=#E9E9E9
| 68080 ||  || — || December 30, 2000 || Socorro || LINEAR || — || align=right | 1.9 km || 
|-id=081 bgcolor=#E9E9E9
| 68081 ||  || — || December 30, 2000 || Socorro || LINEAR || — || align=right | 2.9 km || 
|-id=082 bgcolor=#fefefe
| 68082 ||  || — || December 28, 2000 || Socorro || LINEAR || — || align=right | 2.2 km || 
|-id=083 bgcolor=#fefefe
| 68083 ||  || — || December 28, 2000 || Socorro || LINEAR || — || align=right | 3.4 km || 
|-id=084 bgcolor=#E9E9E9
| 68084 ||  || — || December 28, 2000 || Socorro || LINEAR || — || align=right | 3.4 km || 
|-id=085 bgcolor=#d6d6d6
| 68085 ||  || — || December 28, 2000 || Socorro || LINEAR || EUP || align=right | 15 km || 
|-id=086 bgcolor=#E9E9E9
| 68086 ||  || — || December 28, 2000 || Socorro || LINEAR || — || align=right | 6.4 km || 
|-id=087 bgcolor=#E9E9E9
| 68087 ||  || — || December 28, 2000 || Socorro || LINEAR || — || align=right | 7.2 km || 
|-id=088 bgcolor=#fefefe
| 68088 ||  || — || December 30, 2000 || Socorro || LINEAR || V || align=right | 1.7 km || 
|-id=089 bgcolor=#fefefe
| 68089 ||  || — || December 30, 2000 || Socorro || LINEAR || NYS || align=right | 2.2 km || 
|-id=090 bgcolor=#E9E9E9
| 68090 ||  || — || December 30, 2000 || Socorro || LINEAR || RAF || align=right | 2.1 km || 
|-id=091 bgcolor=#fefefe
| 68091 ||  || — || December 30, 2000 || Socorro || LINEAR || — || align=right | 2.6 km || 
|-id=092 bgcolor=#fefefe
| 68092 ||  || — || December 30, 2000 || Socorro || LINEAR || NYS || align=right | 1.9 km || 
|-id=093 bgcolor=#fefefe
| 68093 ||  || — || December 30, 2000 || Socorro || LINEAR || FLO || align=right | 1.6 km || 
|-id=094 bgcolor=#fefefe
| 68094 ||  || — || December 30, 2000 || Socorro || LINEAR || — || align=right | 2.2 km || 
|-id=095 bgcolor=#fefefe
| 68095 ||  || — || December 30, 2000 || Socorro || LINEAR || FLO || align=right | 2.2 km || 
|-id=096 bgcolor=#fefefe
| 68096 ||  || — || December 30, 2000 || Socorro || LINEAR || — || align=right | 2.3 km || 
|-id=097 bgcolor=#E9E9E9
| 68097 ||  || — || December 30, 2000 || Socorro || LINEAR || — || align=right | 5.4 km || 
|-id=098 bgcolor=#d6d6d6
| 68098 ||  || — || December 30, 2000 || Socorro || LINEAR || URS || align=right | 9.6 km || 
|-id=099 bgcolor=#E9E9E9
| 68099 ||  || — || December 27, 2000 || Anderson Mesa || LONEOS || — || align=right | 5.6 km || 
|-id=100 bgcolor=#fefefe
| 68100 ||  || — || December 20, 2000 || Socorro || LINEAR || — || align=right | 1.4 km || 
|}

68101–68200 

|-bgcolor=#fefefe
| 68101 ||  || — || December 22, 2000 || Socorro || LINEAR || PHO || align=right | 2.7 km || 
|-id=102 bgcolor=#E9E9E9
| 68102 ||  || — || December 23, 2000 || Socorro || LINEAR || — || align=right | 2.5 km || 
|-id=103 bgcolor=#E9E9E9
| 68103 ||  || — || December 28, 2000 || Socorro || LINEAR || — || align=right | 3.1 km || 
|-id=104 bgcolor=#d6d6d6
| 68104 ||  || — || December 29, 2000 || Anderson Mesa || LONEOS || — || align=right | 7.2 km || 
|-id=105 bgcolor=#E9E9E9
| 68105 ||  || — || December 29, 2000 || Anderson Mesa || LONEOS || — || align=right | 7.6 km || 
|-id=106 bgcolor=#fefefe
| 68106 ||  || — || December 29, 2000 || Haleakala || NEAT || — || align=right | 2.7 km || 
|-id=107 bgcolor=#E9E9E9
| 68107 ||  || — || December 30, 2000 || Desert Beaver || W. K. Y. Yeung || — || align=right | 2.3 km || 
|-id=108 bgcolor=#E9E9E9
| 68108 ||  || — || December 30, 2000 || Anderson Mesa || LONEOS || MAR || align=right | 6.0 km || 
|-id=109 bgcolor=#fefefe
| 68109 Naomipasachoff ||  ||  || December 17, 2000 || Anderson Mesa || LONEOS || — || align=right | 3.6 km || 
|-id=110 bgcolor=#fefefe
| 68110 ||  || — || December 17, 2000 || Anderson Mesa || LONEOS || — || align=right | 1.9 km || 
|-id=111 bgcolor=#E9E9E9
| 68111 ||  || — || December 27, 2000 || Kitt Peak || Spacewatch || — || align=right | 3.6 km || 
|-id=112 bgcolor=#C2FFFF
| 68112 ||  || — || December 19, 2000 || Kitt Peak || Spacewatch || L4 || align=right | 15 km || 
|-id=113 bgcolor=#fefefe
| 68113 ||  || — || December 21, 2000 || Socorro || LINEAR || — || align=right | 2.0 km || 
|-id=114 bgcolor=#fefefe
| 68114 Deákferenc || 2001 AC ||  || January 1, 2001 || Piszkéstető || K. Sárneczky, L. Kiss || ERI || align=right | 5.4 km || 
|-id=115 bgcolor=#fefefe
| 68115 ||  || — || January 3, 2001 || Desert Beaver || W. K. Y. Yeung || FLO || align=right | 1.6 km || 
|-id=116 bgcolor=#fefefe
| 68116 ||  || — || January 2, 2001 || Socorro || LINEAR || — || align=right | 1.9 km || 
|-id=117 bgcolor=#E9E9E9
| 68117 ||  || — || January 2, 2001 || Socorro || LINEAR || — || align=right | 4.2 km || 
|-id=118 bgcolor=#E9E9E9
| 68118 ||  || — || January 2, 2001 || Socorro || LINEAR || — || align=right | 3.0 km || 
|-id=119 bgcolor=#fefefe
| 68119 ||  || — || January 2, 2001 || Socorro || LINEAR || ERI || align=right | 4.8 km || 
|-id=120 bgcolor=#fefefe
| 68120 ||  || — || January 2, 2001 || Socorro || LINEAR || — || align=right | 1.8 km || 
|-id=121 bgcolor=#E9E9E9
| 68121 ||  || — || January 2, 2001 || Socorro || LINEAR || — || align=right | 2.2 km || 
|-id=122 bgcolor=#E9E9E9
| 68122 ||  || — || January 2, 2001 || Socorro || LINEAR || — || align=right | 2.1 km || 
|-id=123 bgcolor=#E9E9E9
| 68123 ||  || — || January 2, 2001 || Socorro || LINEAR || — || align=right | 2.3 km || 
|-id=124 bgcolor=#d6d6d6
| 68124 ||  || — || January 2, 2001 || Socorro || LINEAR || — || align=right | 4.6 km || 
|-id=125 bgcolor=#E9E9E9
| 68125 ||  || — || January 2, 2001 || Socorro || LINEAR || NEM || align=right | 5.7 km || 
|-id=126 bgcolor=#E9E9E9
| 68126 ||  || — || January 2, 2001 || Socorro || LINEAR || — || align=right | 2.4 km || 
|-id=127 bgcolor=#fefefe
| 68127 ||  || — || January 2, 2001 || Socorro || LINEAR || — || align=right | 3.0 km || 
|-id=128 bgcolor=#E9E9E9
| 68128 ||  || — || January 2, 2001 || Socorro || LINEAR || EUN || align=right | 3.4 km || 
|-id=129 bgcolor=#fefefe
| 68129 ||  || — || January 2, 2001 || Socorro || LINEAR || — || align=right | 3.9 km || 
|-id=130 bgcolor=#E9E9E9
| 68130 ||  || — || January 2, 2001 || Socorro || LINEAR || EUN || align=right | 8.6 km || 
|-id=131 bgcolor=#d6d6d6
| 68131 ||  || — || January 2, 2001 || Socorro || LINEAR || EOS || align=right | 5.2 km || 
|-id=132 bgcolor=#d6d6d6
| 68132 ||  || — || January 2, 2001 || Socorro || LINEAR || — || align=right | 10 km || 
|-id=133 bgcolor=#E9E9E9
| 68133 ||  || — || January 2, 2001 || Socorro || LINEAR || — || align=right | 11 km || 
|-id=134 bgcolor=#FA8072
| 68134 ||  || — || January 4, 2001 || Anderson Mesa || LONEOS || — || align=right | 3.9 km || 
|-id=135 bgcolor=#fefefe
| 68135 ||  || — || January 2, 2001 || Socorro || LINEAR || — || align=right | 4.6 km || 
|-id=136 bgcolor=#fefefe
| 68136 ||  || — || January 3, 2001 || Socorro || LINEAR || — || align=right | 2.8 km || 
|-id=137 bgcolor=#d6d6d6
| 68137 ||  || — || January 3, 2001 || Socorro || LINEAR || URS || align=right | 7.6 km || 
|-id=138 bgcolor=#d6d6d6
| 68138 ||  || — || January 4, 2001 || Socorro || LINEAR || — || align=right | 9.0 km || 
|-id=139 bgcolor=#fefefe
| 68139 ||  || — || January 4, 2001 || Socorro || LINEAR || V || align=right | 2.0 km || 
|-id=140 bgcolor=#fefefe
| 68140 ||  || — || January 5, 2001 || Socorro || LINEAR || FLO || align=right | 2.0 km || 
|-id=141 bgcolor=#fefefe
| 68141 ||  || — || January 4, 2001 || Socorro || LINEAR || — || align=right | 1.9 km || 
|-id=142 bgcolor=#fefefe
| 68142 ||  || — || January 4, 2001 || Socorro || LINEAR || — || align=right | 3.3 km || 
|-id=143 bgcolor=#fefefe
| 68143 ||  || — || January 5, 2001 || Socorro || LINEAR || — || align=right | 2.5 km || 
|-id=144 bgcolor=#E9E9E9
| 68144 Mizser ||  ||  || January 1, 2001 || Piszkéstető || K. Sárneczky, L. Kiss || — || align=right | 4.8 km || 
|-id=145 bgcolor=#fefefe
| 68145 ||  || — || January 7, 2001 || Socorro || LINEAR || — || align=right | 6.6 km || 
|-id=146 bgcolor=#fefefe
| 68146 ||  || — || January 7, 2001 || Socorro || LINEAR || — || align=right | 6.6 km || 
|-id=147 bgcolor=#d6d6d6
| 68147 ||  || — || January 15, 2001 || Oizumi || T. Kobayashi || TIR || align=right | 7.4 km || 
|-id=148 bgcolor=#d6d6d6
| 68148 ||  || — || January 15, 2001 || Oizumi || T. Kobayashi || — || align=right | 12 km || 
|-id=149 bgcolor=#fefefe
| 68149 ||  || — || January 4, 2001 || Socorro || LINEAR || — || align=right | 2.4 km || 
|-id=150 bgcolor=#fefefe
| 68150 ||  || — || January 15, 2001 || Socorro || LINEAR || V || align=right | 1.6 km || 
|-id=151 bgcolor=#E9E9E9
| 68151 ||  || — || January 15, 2001 || Socorro || LINEAR || — || align=right | 2.7 km || 
|-id=152 bgcolor=#E9E9E9
| 68152 || 2001 BO || — || January 17, 2001 || Oizumi || T. Kobayashi || MAR || align=right | 2.9 km || 
|-id=153 bgcolor=#fefefe
| 68153 || 2001 BV || — || January 17, 2001 || Oizumi || T. Kobayashi || V || align=right | 2.2 km || 
|-id=154 bgcolor=#d6d6d6
| 68154 ||  || — || January 16, 2001 || Haleakala || NEAT || — || align=right | 6.6 km || 
|-id=155 bgcolor=#fefefe
| 68155 ||  || — || January 19, 2001 || Socorro || LINEAR || V || align=right | 1.9 km || 
|-id=156 bgcolor=#d6d6d6
| 68156 ||  || — || January 16, 2001 || Haleakala || NEAT || — || align=right | 8.5 km || 
|-id=157 bgcolor=#d6d6d6
| 68157 ||  || — || January 21, 2001 || Socorro || LINEAR || EOS || align=right | 4.2 km || 
|-id=158 bgcolor=#E9E9E9
| 68158 ||  || — || January 21, 2001 || Oizumi || T. Kobayashi || — || align=right | 5.8 km || 
|-id=159 bgcolor=#d6d6d6
| 68159 ||  || — || January 21, 2001 || Oizumi || T. Kobayashi || — || align=right | 7.4 km || 
|-id=160 bgcolor=#fefefe
| 68160 ||  || — || January 19, 2001 || Socorro || LINEAR || — || align=right | 2.7 km || 
|-id=161 bgcolor=#fefefe
| 68161 ||  || — || January 20, 2001 || Socorro || LINEAR || — || align=right | 2.5 km || 
|-id=162 bgcolor=#fefefe
| 68162 ||  || — || January 20, 2001 || Socorro || LINEAR || — || align=right | 1.6 km || 
|-id=163 bgcolor=#fefefe
| 68163 ||  || — || January 20, 2001 || Socorro || LINEAR || — || align=right | 2.2 km || 
|-id=164 bgcolor=#E9E9E9
| 68164 ||  || — || January 20, 2001 || Socorro || LINEAR || — || align=right | 6.0 km || 
|-id=165 bgcolor=#E9E9E9
| 68165 ||  || — || January 20, 2001 || Socorro || LINEAR || — || align=right | 2.9 km || 
|-id=166 bgcolor=#E9E9E9
| 68166 ||  || — || January 20, 2001 || Socorro || LINEAR || GER || align=right | 3.2 km || 
|-id=167 bgcolor=#E9E9E9
| 68167 ||  || — || January 20, 2001 || Socorro || LINEAR || WIT || align=right | 2.5 km || 
|-id=168 bgcolor=#fefefe
| 68168 ||  || — || January 20, 2001 || Socorro || LINEAR || — || align=right | 5.1 km || 
|-id=169 bgcolor=#E9E9E9
| 68169 ||  || — || January 20, 2001 || Socorro || LINEAR || — || align=right | 3.8 km || 
|-id=170 bgcolor=#E9E9E9
| 68170 ||  || — || January 20, 2001 || Socorro || LINEAR || — || align=right | 2.5 km || 
|-id=171 bgcolor=#d6d6d6
| 68171 ||  || — || January 20, 2001 || Socorro || LINEAR || — || align=right | 8.1 km || 
|-id=172 bgcolor=#d6d6d6
| 68172 ||  || — || January 20, 2001 || Socorro || LINEAR || EOS || align=right | 6.1 km || 
|-id=173 bgcolor=#E9E9E9
| 68173 ||  || — || January 21, 2001 || Socorro || LINEAR || — || align=right | 4.3 km || 
|-id=174 bgcolor=#d6d6d6
| 68174 ||  || — || January 24, 2001 || Haleakala || NEAT || — || align=right | 6.2 km || 
|-id=175 bgcolor=#E9E9E9
| 68175 ||  || — || January 20, 2001 || Socorro || LINEAR || — || align=right | 3.1 km || 
|-id=176 bgcolor=#E9E9E9
| 68176 ||  || — || January 21, 2001 || Socorro || LINEAR || — || align=right | 2.9 km || 
|-id=177 bgcolor=#E9E9E9
| 68177 ||  || — || January 21, 2001 || Socorro || LINEAR || — || align=right | 4.8 km || 
|-id=178 bgcolor=#E9E9E9
| 68178 ||  || — || January 21, 2001 || Socorro || LINEAR || — || align=right | 6.2 km || 
|-id=179 bgcolor=#d6d6d6
| 68179 ||  || — || January 21, 2001 || Socorro || LINEAR || — || align=right | 8.8 km || 
|-id=180 bgcolor=#E9E9E9
| 68180 ||  || — || January 21, 2001 || Socorro || LINEAR || GEF || align=right | 5.1 km || 
|-id=181 bgcolor=#E9E9E9
| 68181 ||  || — || January 21, 2001 || Socorro || LINEAR || EUN || align=right | 3.7 km || 
|-id=182 bgcolor=#E9E9E9
| 68182 ||  || — || January 21, 2001 || Socorro || LINEAR || EUN || align=right | 3.6 km || 
|-id=183 bgcolor=#fefefe
| 68183 ||  || — || January 24, 2001 || Socorro || LINEAR || — || align=right | 2.0 km || 
|-id=184 bgcolor=#fefefe
| 68184 ||  || — || January 25, 2001 || Farpoint || G. Hug || KLI || align=right | 3.8 km || 
|-id=185 bgcolor=#E9E9E9
| 68185 ||  || — || January 28, 2001 || Oizumi || T. Kobayashi || EUN || align=right | 3.8 km || 
|-id=186 bgcolor=#E9E9E9
| 68186 ||  || — || January 17, 2001 || Kitt Peak || Spacewatch || HEN || align=right | 2.3 km || 
|-id=187 bgcolor=#E9E9E9
| 68187 ||  || — || January 18, 2001 || Haleakala || NEAT || — || align=right | 3.4 km || 
|-id=188 bgcolor=#E9E9E9
| 68188 ||  || — || January 21, 2001 || Socorro || LINEAR || — || align=right | 3.0 km || 
|-id=189 bgcolor=#fefefe
| 68189 ||  || — || January 21, 2001 || Socorro || LINEAR || — || align=right | 2.5 km || 
|-id=190 bgcolor=#d6d6d6
| 68190 ||  || — || January 21, 2001 || Socorro || LINEAR || — || align=right | 7.3 km || 
|-id=191 bgcolor=#d6d6d6
| 68191 ||  || — || January 26, 2001 || Socorro || LINEAR || EOS || align=right | 6.9 km || 
|-id=192 bgcolor=#E9E9E9
| 68192 ||  || — || January 31, 2001 || Desert Beaver || W. K. Y. Yeung || MAR || align=right | 4.6 km || 
|-id=193 bgcolor=#d6d6d6
| 68193 ||  || — || January 26, 2001 || Socorro || LINEAR || — || align=right | 6.4 km || 
|-id=194 bgcolor=#fefefe
| 68194 ||  || — || January 29, 2001 || Socorro || LINEAR || — || align=right | 2.1 km || 
|-id=195 bgcolor=#d6d6d6
| 68195 ||  || — || January 31, 2001 || Kitt Peak || Spacewatch || — || align=right | 7.8 km || 
|-id=196 bgcolor=#d6d6d6
| 68196 ||  || — || January 26, 2001 || Socorro || LINEAR || EOS || align=right | 5.8 km || 
|-id=197 bgcolor=#d6d6d6
| 68197 ||  || — || January 26, 2001 || Socorro || LINEAR || — || align=right | 10 km || 
|-id=198 bgcolor=#d6d6d6
| 68198 ||  || — || January 29, 2001 || Socorro || LINEAR || — || align=right | 6.5 km || 
|-id=199 bgcolor=#E9E9E9
| 68199 ||  || — || January 31, 2001 || Socorro || LINEAR || — || align=right | 2.1 km || 
|-id=200 bgcolor=#d6d6d6
| 68200 ||  || — || January 26, 2001 || Kitt Peak || Spacewatch || — || align=right | 6.4 km || 
|}

68201–68300 

|-bgcolor=#E9E9E9
| 68201 ||  || — || January 26, 2001 || Haleakala || NEAT || — || align=right | 2.4 km || 
|-id=202 bgcolor=#d6d6d6
| 68202 ||  || — || January 24, 2001 || Socorro || LINEAR || EOS || align=right | 4.2 km || 
|-id=203 bgcolor=#fefefe
| 68203 ||  || — || January 21, 2001 || Socorro || LINEAR || MAS || align=right | 1.9 km || 
|-id=204 bgcolor=#E9E9E9
| 68204 ||  || — || January 19, 2001 || Socorro || LINEAR || GEF || align=right | 2.8 km || 
|-id=205 bgcolor=#E9E9E9
| 68205 || 2001 CS || — || February 1, 2001 || Socorro || LINEAR || BRU || align=right | 8.0 km || 
|-id=206 bgcolor=#d6d6d6
| 68206 ||  || — || February 1, 2001 || Socorro || LINEAR || — || align=right | 5.3 km || 
|-id=207 bgcolor=#d6d6d6
| 68207 ||  || — || February 1, 2001 || Socorro || LINEAR || — || align=right | 5.0 km || 
|-id=208 bgcolor=#E9E9E9
| 68208 ||  || — || February 1, 2001 || Socorro || LINEAR || — || align=right | 2.5 km || 
|-id=209 bgcolor=#E9E9E9
| 68209 ||  || — || February 1, 2001 || Socorro || LINEAR || GEF || align=right | 4.4 km || 
|-id=210 bgcolor=#d6d6d6
| 68210 ||  || — || February 1, 2001 || Socorro || LINEAR || — || align=right | 7.9 km || 
|-id=211 bgcolor=#d6d6d6
| 68211 ||  || — || February 1, 2001 || Socorro || LINEAR || — || align=right | 6.8 km || 
|-id=212 bgcolor=#d6d6d6
| 68212 ||  || — || February 1, 2001 || Socorro || LINEAR || — || align=right | 11 km || 
|-id=213 bgcolor=#E9E9E9
| 68213 ||  || — || February 1, 2001 || Anderson Mesa || LONEOS || — || align=right | 2.9 km || 
|-id=214 bgcolor=#d6d6d6
| 68214 ||  || — || February 1, 2001 || Anderson Mesa || LONEOS || EOS || align=right | 4.1 km || 
|-id=215 bgcolor=#fefefe
| 68215 ||  || — || February 1, 2001 || Socorro || LINEAR || NYS || align=right | 1.4 km || 
|-id=216 bgcolor=#FFC2E0
| 68216 ||  || — || February 1, 2001 || Socorro || LINEAR || APO +1kmPHA || align=right data-sort-value="0.99" | 990 m || 
|-id=217 bgcolor=#d6d6d6
| 68217 ||  || — || February 1, 2001 || Haleakala || NEAT || — || align=right | 8.7 km || 
|-id=218 bgcolor=#d6d6d6
| 68218 Nealgalt ||  ||  || February 12, 2001 || Junk Bond || D. Healy || — || align=right | 3.9 km || 
|-id=219 bgcolor=#d6d6d6
| 68219 ||  || — || February 13, 2001 || Socorro || LINEAR || EUP || align=right | 8.9 km || 
|-id=220 bgcolor=#fefefe
| 68220 ||  || — || February 13, 2001 || Socorro || LINEAR || — || align=right | 5.1 km || 
|-id=221 bgcolor=#fefefe
| 68221 ||  || — || February 12, 2001 || Anderson Mesa || LONEOS || V || align=right | 1.6 km || 
|-id=222 bgcolor=#d6d6d6
| 68222 ||  || — || February 12, 2001 || Anderson Mesa || LONEOS || SAN || align=right | 4.1 km || 
|-id=223 bgcolor=#d6d6d6
| 68223 || 2001 DJ || — || February 16, 2001 || Desert Beaver || W. K. Y. Yeung || ALA || align=right | 8.8 km || 
|-id=224 bgcolor=#d6d6d6
| 68224 ||  || — || February 17, 2001 || Socorro || LINEAR || — || align=right | 7.8 km || 
|-id=225 bgcolor=#d6d6d6
| 68225 ||  || — || February 17, 2001 || Socorro || LINEAR || — || align=right | 5.0 km || 
|-id=226 bgcolor=#fefefe
| 68226 ||  || — || February 16, 2001 || Socorro || LINEAR || — || align=right | 3.3 km || 
|-id=227 bgcolor=#d6d6d6
| 68227 ||  || — || February 16, 2001 || Socorro || LINEAR || — || align=right | 7.4 km || 
|-id=228 bgcolor=#E9E9E9
| 68228 ||  || — || February 16, 2001 || Socorro || LINEAR || — || align=right | 4.6 km || 
|-id=229 bgcolor=#fefefe
| 68229 ||  || — || February 17, 2001 || Socorro || LINEAR || — || align=right | 1.5 km || 
|-id=230 bgcolor=#d6d6d6
| 68230 ||  || — || February 17, 2001 || Socorro || LINEAR || — || align=right | 7.2 km || 
|-id=231 bgcolor=#E9E9E9
| 68231 ||  || — || February 17, 2001 || Socorro || LINEAR || EUN || align=right | 4.9 km || 
|-id=232 bgcolor=#E9E9E9
| 68232 ||  || — || February 19, 2001 || Socorro || LINEAR || GEF || align=right | 4.0 km || 
|-id=233 bgcolor=#fefefe
| 68233 ||  || — || February 19, 2001 || Socorro || LINEAR || — || align=right | 2.0 km || 
|-id=234 bgcolor=#d6d6d6
| 68234 ||  || — || February 19, 2001 || Socorro || LINEAR || NAE || align=right | 7.3 km || 
|-id=235 bgcolor=#d6d6d6
| 68235 ||  || — || February 19, 2001 || Socorro || LINEAR || — || align=right | 5.9 km || 
|-id=236 bgcolor=#E9E9E9
| 68236 ||  || — || February 19, 2001 || Socorro || LINEAR || — || align=right | 2.5 km || 
|-id=237 bgcolor=#E9E9E9
| 68237 ||  || — || February 19, 2001 || Socorro || LINEAR || — || align=right | 2.1 km || 
|-id=238 bgcolor=#E9E9E9
| 68238 ||  || — || February 19, 2001 || Socorro || LINEAR || — || align=right | 3.4 km || 
|-id=239 bgcolor=#fefefe
| 68239 ||  || — || February 19, 2001 || Socorro || LINEAR || — || align=right | 1.6 km || 
|-id=240 bgcolor=#d6d6d6
| 68240 ||  || — || February 16, 2001 || Kitt Peak || Spacewatch || THM || align=right | 5.6 km || 
|-id=241 bgcolor=#fefefe
| 68241 ||  || — || February 19, 2001 || Socorro || LINEAR || — || align=right | 1.9 km || 
|-id=242 bgcolor=#fefefe
| 68242 ||  || — || February 19, 2001 || Socorro || LINEAR || V || align=right | 2.0 km || 
|-id=243 bgcolor=#E9E9E9
| 68243 ||  || — || February 19, 2001 || Socorro || LINEAR || HOF || align=right | 4.8 km || 
|-id=244 bgcolor=#d6d6d6
| 68244 ||  || — || February 19, 2001 || Socorro || LINEAR || — || align=right | 8.5 km || 
|-id=245 bgcolor=#d6d6d6
| 68245 ||  || — || February 19, 2001 || Socorro || LINEAR || — || align=right | 6.5 km || 
|-id=246 bgcolor=#fefefe
| 68246 ||  || — || February 19, 2001 || Socorro || LINEAR || — || align=right | 1.6 km || 
|-id=247 bgcolor=#d6d6d6
| 68247 ||  || — || February 19, 2001 || Socorro || LINEAR || SHU3:2 || align=right | 14 km || 
|-id=248 bgcolor=#d6d6d6
| 68248 ||  || — || February 19, 2001 || Socorro || LINEAR || VER || align=right | 8.3 km || 
|-id=249 bgcolor=#fefefe
| 68249 ||  || — || February 19, 2001 || Socorro || LINEAR || NYS || align=right | 1.6 km || 
|-id=250 bgcolor=#E9E9E9
| 68250 ||  || — || February 19, 2001 || Socorro || LINEAR || MAR || align=right | 3.7 km || 
|-id=251 bgcolor=#d6d6d6
| 68251 ||  || — || February 20, 2001 || Socorro || LINEAR || EOS || align=right | 5.0 km || 
|-id=252 bgcolor=#E9E9E9
| 68252 ||  || — || February 22, 2001 || Socorro || LINEAR || — || align=right | 4.0 km || 
|-id=253 bgcolor=#d6d6d6
| 68253 ||  || — || February 17, 2001 || Socorro || LINEAR || EOS || align=right | 4.7 km || 
|-id=254 bgcolor=#d6d6d6
| 68254 ||  || — || February 17, 2001 || Socorro || LINEAR || EOS || align=right | 3.8 km || 
|-id=255 bgcolor=#E9E9E9
| 68255 ||  || — || February 17, 2001 || Socorro || LINEAR || — || align=right | 3.4 km || 
|-id=256 bgcolor=#fefefe
| 68256 ||  || — || February 17, 2001 || Haleakala || NEAT || ERI || align=right | 3.7 km || 
|-id=257 bgcolor=#d6d6d6
| 68257 ||  || — || February 17, 2001 || Haleakala || NEAT || ALA || align=right | 14 km || 
|-id=258 bgcolor=#E9E9E9
| 68258 ||  || — || February 16, 2001 || Socorro || LINEAR || — || align=right | 5.0 km || 
|-id=259 bgcolor=#d6d6d6
| 68259 ||  || — || February 16, 2001 || Anderson Mesa || LONEOS || — || align=right | 7.7 km || 
|-id=260 bgcolor=#d6d6d6
| 68260 ||  || — || February 22, 2001 || Haleakala || NEAT || ALA || align=right | 7.3 km || 
|-id=261 bgcolor=#d6d6d6
| 68261 || 2001 EU || — || March 2, 2001 || Haleakala || NEAT || — || align=right | 7.7 km || 
|-id=262 bgcolor=#d6d6d6
| 68262 ||  || — || March 4, 2001 || Socorro || LINEAR || ITH || align=right | 3.5 km || 
|-id=263 bgcolor=#fefefe
| 68263 ||  || — || March 14, 2001 || Prescott || P. G. Comba || NYS || align=right | 4.4 km || 
|-id=264 bgcolor=#E9E9E9
| 68264 ||  || — || March 11, 2001 || Haleakala || NEAT || — || align=right | 3.4 km || 
|-id=265 bgcolor=#E9E9E9
| 68265 ||  || — || March 15, 2001 || Socorro || LINEAR || EUN || align=right | 3.7 km || 
|-id=266 bgcolor=#d6d6d6
| 68266 ||  || — || March 15, 2001 || Socorro || LINEAR || URS || align=right | 7.6 km || 
|-id=267 bgcolor=#FFC2E0
| 68267 ||  || — || March 4, 2001 || Haleakala || NEAT || APO +1km || align=right data-sort-value="0.88" | 880 m || 
|-id=268 bgcolor=#d6d6d6
| 68268 ||  || — || March 14, 2001 || Anderson Mesa || LONEOS || — || align=right | 6.3 km || 
|-id=269 bgcolor=#d6d6d6
| 68269 ||  || — || March 15, 2001 || Anderson Mesa || LONEOS || — || align=right | 4.0 km || 
|-id=270 bgcolor=#d6d6d6
| 68270 ||  || — || March 15, 2001 || Anderson Mesa || LONEOS || — || align=right | 4.8 km || 
|-id=271 bgcolor=#d6d6d6
| 68271 ||  || — || March 15, 2001 || Anderson Mesa || LONEOS || — || align=right | 7.5 km || 
|-id=272 bgcolor=#d6d6d6
| 68272 ||  || — || March 15, 2001 || Haleakala || NEAT || — || align=right | 3.1 km || 
|-id=273 bgcolor=#d6d6d6
| 68273 ||  || — || March 2, 2001 || Anderson Mesa || LONEOS || — || align=right | 8.1 km || 
|-id=274 bgcolor=#d6d6d6
| 68274 ||  || — || March 18, 2001 || Socorro || LINEAR || — || align=right | 7.4 km || 
|-id=275 bgcolor=#fefefe
| 68275 ||  || — || March 18, 2001 || Socorro || LINEAR || NYS || align=right | 1.4 km || 
|-id=276 bgcolor=#d6d6d6
| 68276 ||  || — || March 18, 2001 || Socorro || LINEAR || EOS || align=right | 5.3 km || 
|-id=277 bgcolor=#fefefe
| 68277 ||  || — || March 18, 2001 || Socorro || LINEAR || V || align=right | 1.5 km || 
|-id=278 bgcolor=#FFC2E0
| 68278 ||  || — || March 18, 2001 || Kitt Peak || Spacewatch || AMO || align=right data-sort-value="0.94" | 940 m || 
|-id=279 bgcolor=#fefefe
| 68279 ||  || — || March 18, 2001 || Socorro || LINEAR || NYS || align=right | 3.2 km || 
|-id=280 bgcolor=#E9E9E9
| 68280 ||  || — || March 18, 2001 || Socorro || LINEAR || EUN || align=right | 6.1 km || 
|-id=281 bgcolor=#fefefe
| 68281 ||  || — || March 19, 2001 || Anderson Mesa || LONEOS || NYS || align=right | 1.8 km || 
|-id=282 bgcolor=#d6d6d6
| 68282 ||  || — || March 19, 2001 || Anderson Mesa || LONEOS || EOS || align=right | 4.5 km || 
|-id=283 bgcolor=#d6d6d6
| 68283 ||  || — || March 19, 2001 || Anderson Mesa || LONEOS || HYG || align=right | 8.7 km || 
|-id=284 bgcolor=#E9E9E9
| 68284 ||  || — || March 19, 2001 || Anderson Mesa || LONEOS || BAR || align=right | 3.8 km || 
|-id=285 bgcolor=#d6d6d6
| 68285 ||  || — || March 19, 2001 || Anderson Mesa || LONEOS || — || align=right | 7.9 km || 
|-id=286 bgcolor=#d6d6d6
| 68286 ||  || — || March 21, 2001 || Anderson Mesa || LONEOS || — || align=right | 9.9 km || 
|-id=287 bgcolor=#d6d6d6
| 68287 ||  || — || March 17, 2001 || Socorro || LINEAR || 3:2 || align=right | 13 km || 
|-id=288 bgcolor=#E9E9E9
| 68288 ||  || — || March 18, 2001 || Socorro || LINEAR || — || align=right | 5.0 km || 
|-id=289 bgcolor=#E9E9E9
| 68289 ||  || — || March 18, 2001 || Socorro || LINEAR || HNS || align=right | 4.1 km || 
|-id=290 bgcolor=#E9E9E9
| 68290 ||  || — || March 18, 2001 || Socorro || LINEAR || — || align=right | 2.6 km || 
|-id=291 bgcolor=#d6d6d6
| 68291 ||  || — || March 18, 2001 || Socorro || LINEAR || VER || align=right | 6.4 km || 
|-id=292 bgcolor=#d6d6d6
| 68292 ||  || — || March 18, 2001 || Socorro || LINEAR || — || align=right | 6.2 km || 
|-id=293 bgcolor=#E9E9E9
| 68293 ||  || — || March 18, 2001 || Socorro || LINEAR || EUN || align=right | 3.9 km || 
|-id=294 bgcolor=#d6d6d6
| 68294 ||  || — || March 18, 2001 || Socorro || LINEAR || — || align=right | 9.8 km || 
|-id=295 bgcolor=#d6d6d6
| 68295 ||  || — || March 18, 2001 || Socorro || LINEAR || ALA || align=right | 7.7 km || 
|-id=296 bgcolor=#E9E9E9
| 68296 ||  || — || March 19, 2001 || Socorro || LINEAR || KRM || align=right | 2.6 km || 
|-id=297 bgcolor=#d6d6d6
| 68297 ||  || — || March 19, 2001 || Socorro || LINEAR || — || align=right | 11 km || 
|-id=298 bgcolor=#E9E9E9
| 68298 ||  || — || March 21, 2001 || Socorro || LINEAR || — || align=right | 2.4 km || 
|-id=299 bgcolor=#E9E9E9
| 68299 ||  || — || March 23, 2001 || Socorro || LINEAR || PAL || align=right | 7.1 km || 
|-id=300 bgcolor=#d6d6d6
| 68300 ||  || — || March 16, 2001 || Socorro || LINEAR || ALA || align=right | 10 km || 
|}

68301–68400 

|-bgcolor=#fefefe
| 68301 ||  || — || March 16, 2001 || Socorro || LINEAR || V || align=right | 1.9 km || 
|-id=302 bgcolor=#d6d6d6
| 68302 ||  || — || March 16, 2001 || Socorro || LINEAR || — || align=right | 6.6 km || 
|-id=303 bgcolor=#E9E9E9
| 68303 ||  || — || March 16, 2001 || Socorro || LINEAR || — || align=right | 5.4 km || 
|-id=304 bgcolor=#d6d6d6
| 68304 ||  || — || March 16, 2001 || Socorro || LINEAR || — || align=right | 11 km || 
|-id=305 bgcolor=#d6d6d6
| 68305 ||  || — || March 18, 2001 || Socorro || LINEAR || — || align=right | 11 km || 
|-id=306 bgcolor=#E9E9E9
| 68306 ||  || — || March 18, 2001 || Socorro || LINEAR || WIT || align=right | 3.5 km || 
|-id=307 bgcolor=#E9E9E9
| 68307 ||  || — || March 18, 2001 || Anderson Mesa || LONEOS || — || align=right | 5.8 km || 
|-id=308 bgcolor=#E9E9E9
| 68308 ||  || — || March 18, 2001 || Anderson Mesa || LONEOS || — || align=right | 6.7 km || 
|-id=309 bgcolor=#fefefe
| 68309 ||  || — || March 18, 2001 || Anderson Mesa || LONEOS || FLO || align=right data-sort-value="0.99" | 990 m || 
|-id=310 bgcolor=#E9E9E9
| 68310 ||  || — || March 18, 2001 || Socorro || LINEAR || — || align=right | 4.5 km || 
|-id=311 bgcolor=#d6d6d6
| 68311 ||  || — || March 18, 2001 || Haleakala || NEAT || EOS || align=right | 4.3 km || 
|-id=312 bgcolor=#d6d6d6
| 68312 ||  || — || March 19, 2001 || Haleakala || NEAT || — || align=right | 7.4 km || 
|-id=313 bgcolor=#d6d6d6
| 68313 ||  || — || March 20, 2001 || Haleakala || NEAT || — || align=right | 7.5 km || 
|-id=314 bgcolor=#d6d6d6
| 68314 ||  || — || March 28, 2001 || Kitt Peak || Spacewatch || THM || align=right | 7.1 km || 
|-id=315 bgcolor=#d6d6d6
| 68315 ||  || — || March 23, 2001 || Haleakala || NEAT || EUP || align=right | 8.2 km || 
|-id=316 bgcolor=#d6d6d6
| 68316 ||  || — || March 23, 2001 || Haleakala || NEAT || AEG || align=right | 8.2 km || 
|-id=317 bgcolor=#E9E9E9
| 68317 ||  || — || March 24, 2001 || Anderson Mesa || LONEOS || EUN || align=right | 3.8 km || 
|-id=318 bgcolor=#fefefe
| 68318 ||  || — || March 26, 2001 || Socorro || LINEAR || — || align=right | 1.9 km || 
|-id=319 bgcolor=#d6d6d6
| 68319 ||  || — || March 26, 2001 || Haleakala || NEAT || — || align=right | 4.1 km || 
|-id=320 bgcolor=#E9E9E9
| 68320 ||  || — || March 29, 2001 || Anderson Mesa || LONEOS || — || align=right | 6.0 km || 
|-id=321 bgcolor=#d6d6d6
| 68321 ||  || — || March 23, 2001 || Anderson Mesa || LONEOS || EOS || align=right | 4.8 km || 
|-id=322 bgcolor=#E9E9E9
| 68322 ||  || — || March 31, 2001 || Socorro || LINEAR || — || align=right | 5.8 km || 
|-id=323 bgcolor=#E9E9E9
| 68323 ||  || — || March 21, 2001 || Kitt Peak || Spacewatch || — || align=right | 5.2 km || 
|-id=324 bgcolor=#d6d6d6
| 68324 ||  || — || March 25, 2001 || Kitt Peak || M. W. Buie || — || align=right | 5.3 km || 
|-id=325 bgcolor=#d6d6d6
| 68325 Begues ||  ||  || April 23, 2001 || Begues || J. Manteca || — || align=right | 4.5 km || 
|-id=326 bgcolor=#fefefe
| 68326 ||  || — || April 23, 2001 || Socorro || LINEAR || — || align=right | 1.4 km || 
|-id=327 bgcolor=#d6d6d6
| 68327 ||  || — || April 29, 2001 || Socorro || LINEAR || TEL || align=right | 7.1 km || 
|-id=328 bgcolor=#E9E9E9
| 68328 ||  || — || April 16, 2001 || Anderson Mesa || LONEOS || — || align=right | 4.0 km || 
|-id=329 bgcolor=#fefefe
| 68329 ||  || — || April 21, 2001 || Socorro || LINEAR || — || align=right | 3.5 km || 
|-id=330 bgcolor=#E9E9E9
| 68330 ||  || — || April 21, 2001 || Socorro || LINEAR || — || align=right | 5.3 km || 
|-id=331 bgcolor=#d6d6d6
| 68331 ||  || — || April 25, 2001 || Haleakala || NEAT || — || align=right | 9.2 km || 
|-id=332 bgcolor=#E9E9E9
| 68332 || 2001 KO || — || May 17, 2001 || Socorro || LINEAR || GEF || align=right | 2.8 km || 
|-id=333 bgcolor=#fefefe
| 68333 ||  || — || May 17, 2001 || Socorro || LINEAR || — || align=right | 2.4 km || 
|-id=334 bgcolor=#fefefe
| 68334 ||  || — || May 18, 2001 || Socorro || LINEAR || FLO || align=right | 2.0 km || 
|-id=335 bgcolor=#fefefe
| 68335 ||  || — || May 18, 2001 || Socorro || LINEAR || — || align=right | 2.9 km || 
|-id=336 bgcolor=#E9E9E9
| 68336 ||  || — || May 23, 2001 || Socorro || LINEAR || — || align=right | 3.3 km || 
|-id=337 bgcolor=#fefefe
| 68337 ||  || — || May 17, 2001 || Socorro || LINEAR || — || align=right | 2.2 km || 
|-id=338 bgcolor=#fefefe
| 68338 ||  || — || May 17, 2001 || Socorro || LINEAR || MAS || align=right | 1.8 km || 
|-id=339 bgcolor=#E9E9E9
| 68339 ||  || — || May 17, 2001 || Socorro || LINEAR || — || align=right | 5.9 km || 
|-id=340 bgcolor=#E9E9E9
| 68340 ||  || — || May 17, 2001 || Socorro || LINEAR || MIS || align=right | 5.0 km || 
|-id=341 bgcolor=#d6d6d6
| 68341 ||  || — || May 22, 2001 || Socorro || LINEAR || — || align=right | 4.4 km || 
|-id=342 bgcolor=#fefefe
| 68342 ||  || — || May 22, 2001 || Socorro || LINEAR || V || align=right | 1.7 km || 
|-id=343 bgcolor=#E9E9E9
| 68343 ||  || — || May 22, 2001 || Socorro || LINEAR || — || align=right | 3.1 km || 
|-id=344 bgcolor=#fefefe
| 68344 ||  || — || May 24, 2001 || Socorro || LINEAR || — || align=right | 2.2 km || 
|-id=345 bgcolor=#E9E9E9
| 68345 ||  || — || May 22, 2001 || Anderson Mesa || LONEOS || — || align=right | 3.6 km || 
|-id=346 bgcolor=#FFC2E0
| 68346 ||  || — || May 29, 2001 || Haleakala || NEAT || APO +1kmPHA || align=right data-sort-value="0.74" | 740 m || 
|-id=347 bgcolor=#FFC2E0
| 68347 ||  || — || May 30, 2001 || Socorro || LINEAR || ATEPHA || align=right data-sort-value="0.38" | 380 m || 
|-id=348 bgcolor=#FFC2E0
| 68348 ||  || — || June 15, 2001 || Socorro || LINEAR || APO +1km || align=right | 3.5 km || 
|-id=349 bgcolor=#E9E9E9
| 68349 ||  || — || June 15, 2001 || Socorro || LINEAR || — || align=right | 3.6 km || 
|-id=350 bgcolor=#FFC2E0
| 68350 ||  || — || June 20, 2001 || Socorro || LINEAR || AMO +1km || align=right | 1.8 km || 
|-id=351 bgcolor=#E9E9E9
| 68351 ||  || — || June 17, 2001 || Palomar || NEAT || — || align=right | 2.9 km || 
|-id=352 bgcolor=#d6d6d6
| 68352 ||  || — || June 21, 2001 || Palomar || NEAT || — || align=right | 7.5 km || 
|-id=353 bgcolor=#d6d6d6
| 68353 ||  || — || June 21, 2001 || Palomar || NEAT || — || align=right | 5.3 km || 
|-id=354 bgcolor=#d6d6d6
| 68354 ||  || — || June 20, 2001 || Anderson Mesa || LONEOS || — || align=right | 7.7 km || 
|-id=355 bgcolor=#E9E9E9
| 68355 || 2001 NZ || — || July 12, 2001 || Palomar || NEAT || EUN || align=right | 6.1 km || 
|-id=356 bgcolor=#fefefe
| 68356 ||  || — || July 13, 2001 || Haleakala || NEAT || — || align=right | 3.9 km || 
|-id=357 bgcolor=#E9E9E9
| 68357 ||  || — || July 13, 2001 || Palomar || NEAT || — || align=right | 2.8 km || 
|-id=358 bgcolor=#E9E9E9
| 68358 ||  || — || July 12, 2001 || Haleakala || NEAT || — || align=right | 6.8 km || 
|-id=359 bgcolor=#FFC2E0
| 68359 ||  || — || July 19, 2001 || Palomar || NEAT || AMO +1km || align=right data-sort-value="0.93" | 930 m || 
|-id=360 bgcolor=#E9E9E9
| 68360 ||  || — || July 16, 2001 || Anderson Mesa || LONEOS || NEM || align=right | 5.3 km || 
|-id=361 bgcolor=#E9E9E9
| 68361 ||  || — || July 19, 2001 || Palomar || NEAT || MAR || align=right | 2.7 km || 
|-id=362 bgcolor=#E9E9E9
| 68362 ||  || — || July 20, 2001 || Palomar || NEAT || MAR || align=right | 7.6 km || 
|-id=363 bgcolor=#d6d6d6
| 68363 ||  || — || July 17, 2001 || Anderson Mesa || LONEOS || — || align=right | 17 km || 
|-id=364 bgcolor=#E9E9E9
| 68364 ||  || — || July 21, 2001 || Haleakala || NEAT || — || align=right | 2.2 km || 
|-id=365 bgcolor=#fefefe
| 68365 ||  || — || July 21, 2001 || Haleakala || NEAT || FLO || align=right | 1.3 km || 
|-id=366 bgcolor=#E9E9E9
| 68366 ||  || — || July 26, 2001 || Palomar || NEAT || — || align=right | 2.0 km || 
|-id=367 bgcolor=#d6d6d6
| 68367 ||  || — || July 21, 2001 || Haleakala || NEAT || — || align=right | 7.5 km || 
|-id=368 bgcolor=#fefefe
| 68368 ||  || — || July 28, 2001 || Haleakala || NEAT || V || align=right | 1.5 km || 
|-id=369 bgcolor=#d6d6d6
| 68369 ||  || — || July 29, 2001 || Socorro || LINEAR || — || align=right | 4.9 km || 
|-id=370 bgcolor=#d6d6d6
| 68370 ||  || — || July 29, 2001 || Socorro || LINEAR || TIR || align=right | 7.1 km || 
|-id=371 bgcolor=#E9E9E9
| 68371 ||  || — || July 29, 2001 || Anderson Mesa || LONEOS || — || align=right | 2.0 km || 
|-id=372 bgcolor=#FFC2E0
| 68372 ||  || — || August 11, 2001 || Palomar || NEAT || APOPHA || align=right data-sort-value="0.63" | 630 m || 
|-id=373 bgcolor=#fefefe
| 68373 ||  || — || August 13, 2001 || Reedy Creek || J. Broughton || FLO || align=right | 1.6 km || 
|-id=374 bgcolor=#d6d6d6
| 68374 ||  || — || August 14, 2001 || Reedy Creek || J. Broughton || HIL3:2 || align=right | 14 km || 
|-id=375 bgcolor=#E9E9E9
| 68375 ||  || — || August 10, 2001 || Haleakala || NEAT || — || align=right | 2.4 km || 
|-id=376 bgcolor=#E9E9E9
| 68376 ||  || — || August 10, 2001 || Haleakala || NEAT || — || align=right | 2.5 km || 
|-id=377 bgcolor=#fefefe
| 68377 ||  || — || August 11, 2001 || Haleakala || NEAT || FLO || align=right | 1.2 km || 
|-id=378 bgcolor=#E9E9E9
| 68378 ||  || — || August 11, 2001 || Palomar || NEAT || — || align=right | 4.2 km || 
|-id=379 bgcolor=#d6d6d6
| 68379 ||  || — || August 12, 2001 || Palomar || NEAT || EOS || align=right | 4.9 km || 
|-id=380 bgcolor=#E9E9E9
| 68380 ||  || — || August 13, 2001 || Haleakala || NEAT || — || align=right | 4.9 km || 
|-id=381 bgcolor=#d6d6d6
| 68381 ||  || — || August 13, 2001 || Haleakala || NEAT || — || align=right | 8.1 km || 
|-id=382 bgcolor=#d6d6d6
| 68382 ||  || — || August 16, 2001 || Socorro || LINEAR || — || align=right | 5.9 km || 
|-id=383 bgcolor=#fefefe
| 68383 ||  || — || August 16, 2001 || Socorro || LINEAR || V || align=right | 1.1 km || 
|-id=384 bgcolor=#E9E9E9
| 68384 ||  || — || August 16, 2001 || Socorro || LINEAR || — || align=right | 3.9 km || 
|-id=385 bgcolor=#d6d6d6
| 68385 ||  || — || August 16, 2001 || Socorro || LINEAR || KOR || align=right | 3.6 km || 
|-id=386 bgcolor=#E9E9E9
| 68386 ||  || — || August 16, 2001 || Socorro || LINEAR || — || align=right | 3.2 km || 
|-id=387 bgcolor=#fefefe
| 68387 ||  || — || August 17, 2001 || Socorro || LINEAR || H || align=right | 1.4 km || 
|-id=388 bgcolor=#E9E9E9
| 68388 ||  || — || August 16, 2001 || Socorro || LINEAR || — || align=right | 2.0 km || 
|-id=389 bgcolor=#E9E9E9
| 68389 ||  || — || August 16, 2001 || Socorro || LINEAR || — || align=right | 4.4 km || 
|-id=390 bgcolor=#E9E9E9
| 68390 ||  || — || August 16, 2001 || Socorro || LINEAR || — || align=right | 1.8 km || 
|-id=391 bgcolor=#E9E9E9
| 68391 ||  || — || August 16, 2001 || Socorro || LINEAR || WIT || align=right | 2.8 km || 
|-id=392 bgcolor=#d6d6d6
| 68392 ||  || — || August 16, 2001 || Socorro || LINEAR || — || align=right | 6.1 km || 
|-id=393 bgcolor=#E9E9E9
| 68393 ||  || — || August 17, 2001 || Socorro || LINEAR || — || align=right | 4.0 km || 
|-id=394 bgcolor=#fefefe
| 68394 ||  || — || August 17, 2001 || Socorro || LINEAR || V || align=right | 1.9 km || 
|-id=395 bgcolor=#E9E9E9
| 68395 ||  || — || August 16, 2001 || Socorro || LINEAR || — || align=right | 7.2 km || 
|-id=396 bgcolor=#E9E9E9
| 68396 ||  || — || August 16, 2001 || Socorro || LINEAR || — || align=right | 2.9 km || 
|-id=397 bgcolor=#d6d6d6
| 68397 ||  || — || August 17, 2001 || Socorro || LINEAR || URS || align=right | 8.9 km || 
|-id=398 bgcolor=#fefefe
| 68398 ||  || — || August 22, 2001 || Desert Eagle || W. K. Y. Yeung || — || align=right | 2.2 km || 
|-id=399 bgcolor=#E9E9E9
| 68399 ||  || — || August 16, 2001 || Palomar || NEAT || — || align=right | 3.0 km || 
|-id=400 bgcolor=#d6d6d6
| 68400 ||  || — || August 16, 2001 || Socorro || LINEAR || EOS || align=right | 5.3 km || 
|}

68401–68500 

|-bgcolor=#fefefe
| 68401 ||  || — || August 22, 2001 || Socorro || LINEAR || — || align=right | 1.6 km || 
|-id=402 bgcolor=#d6d6d6
| 68402 ||  || — || August 19, 2001 || Socorro || LINEAR || HIL3:2 || align=right | 14 km || 
|-id=403 bgcolor=#fefefe
| 68403 ||  || — || August 23, 2001 || Socorro || LINEAR || — || align=right | 1.6 km || 
|-id=404 bgcolor=#E9E9E9
| 68404 ||  || — || August 19, 2001 || Haleakala || NEAT || — || align=right | 7.7 km || 
|-id=405 bgcolor=#E9E9E9
| 68405 ||  || — || August 19, 2001 || Socorro || LINEAR || — || align=right | 3.0 km || 
|-id=406 bgcolor=#fefefe
| 68406 ||  || — || August 20, 2001 || Socorro || LINEAR || V || align=right | 1.5 km || 
|-id=407 bgcolor=#fefefe
| 68407 ||  || — || August 20, 2001 || Socorro || LINEAR || — || align=right | 2.1 km || 
|-id=408 bgcolor=#E9E9E9
| 68408 ||  || — || August 22, 2001 || Socorro || LINEAR || — || align=right | 2.8 km || 
|-id=409 bgcolor=#E9E9E9
| 68409 ||  || — || August 20, 2001 || Haleakala || NEAT || — || align=right | 5.1 km || 
|-id=410 bgcolor=#E9E9E9
| 68410 Nichols ||  ||  || August 16, 2001 || OCA-Anza || M. Collins, M. White || — || align=right | 2.3 km || 
|-id=411 bgcolor=#E9E9E9
| 68411 ||  || — || August 21, 2001 || Haleakala || NEAT || — || align=right | 3.0 km || 
|-id=412 bgcolor=#E9E9E9
| 68412 ||  || — || August 22, 2001 || Kitt Peak || Spacewatch || — || align=right | 1.9 km || 
|-id=413 bgcolor=#d6d6d6
| 68413 ||  || — || August 22, 2001 || Haleakala || NEAT || — || align=right | 6.6 km || 
|-id=414 bgcolor=#fefefe
| 68414 ||  || — || August 23, 2001 || Socorro || LINEAR || — || align=right | 3.1 km || 
|-id=415 bgcolor=#E9E9E9
| 68415 ||  || — || August 23, 2001 || Socorro || LINEAR || MAR || align=right | 2.7 km || 
|-id=416 bgcolor=#E9E9E9
| 68416 ||  || — || August 24, 2001 || Anderson Mesa || LONEOS || — || align=right | 2.4 km || 
|-id=417 bgcolor=#fefefe
| 68417 ||  || — || August 24, 2001 || Socorro || LINEAR || — || align=right | 2.2 km || 
|-id=418 bgcolor=#fefefe
| 68418 ||  || — || August 24, 2001 || Socorro || LINEAR || — || align=right | 2.1 km || 
|-id=419 bgcolor=#E9E9E9
| 68419 ||  || — || August 25, 2001 || Socorro || LINEAR || MRX || align=right | 2.8 km || 
|-id=420 bgcolor=#d6d6d6
| 68420 ||  || — || August 25, 2001 || Socorro || LINEAR || — || align=right | 5.7 km || 
|-id=421 bgcolor=#fefefe
| 68421 ||  || — || August 19, 2001 || Socorro || LINEAR || — || align=right | 2.0 km || 
|-id=422 bgcolor=#d6d6d6
| 68422 ||  || — || August 24, 2001 || Socorro || LINEAR || KOR || align=right | 4.4 km || 
|-id=423 bgcolor=#fefefe
| 68423 ||  || — || August 20, 2001 || Cerro Tololo || M. W. Buie || — || align=right | 1.8 km || 
|-id=424 bgcolor=#fefefe
| 68424 ||  || — || August 16, 2001 || Socorro || LINEAR || V || align=right | 1.4 km || 
|-id=425 bgcolor=#fefefe
| 68425 ||  || — || August 24, 2001 || Anderson Mesa || LONEOS || — || align=right | 2.4 km || 
|-id=426 bgcolor=#d6d6d6
| 68426 || 2001 RE || — || September 2, 2001 || Palomar || NEAT || 627 || align=right | 7.2 km || 
|-id=427 bgcolor=#d6d6d6
| 68427 ||  || — || September 10, 2001 || Desert Eagle || W. K. Y. Yeung || — || align=right | 4.8 km || 
|-id=428 bgcolor=#d6d6d6
| 68428 ||  || — || September 7, 2001 || Socorro || LINEAR || — || align=right | 6.0 km || 
|-id=429 bgcolor=#d6d6d6
| 68429 ||  || — || September 7, 2001 || Socorro || LINEAR || — || align=right | 5.6 km || 
|-id=430 bgcolor=#fefefe
| 68430 ||  || — || September 8, 2001 || Socorro || LINEAR || FLO || align=right | 1.2 km || 
|-id=431 bgcolor=#fefefe
| 68431 ||  || — || September 11, 2001 || Desert Eagle || W. K. Y. Yeung || FLO || align=right | 2.0 km || 
|-id=432 bgcolor=#d6d6d6
| 68432 ||  || — || September 12, 2001 || Socorro || LINEAR || HYG || align=right | 6.3 km || 
|-id=433 bgcolor=#E9E9E9
| 68433 ||  || — || September 10, 2001 || Socorro || LINEAR || — || align=right | 5.0 km || 
|-id=434 bgcolor=#E9E9E9
| 68434 ||  || — || September 10, 2001 || Socorro || LINEAR || — || align=right | 4.7 km || 
|-id=435 bgcolor=#fefefe
| 68435 ||  || — || September 14, 2001 || Palomar || NEAT || FLO || align=right | 2.0 km || 
|-id=436 bgcolor=#E9E9E9
| 68436 ||  || — || September 11, 2001 || Anderson Mesa || LONEOS || — || align=right | 4.1 km || 
|-id=437 bgcolor=#E9E9E9
| 68437 ||  || — || September 11, 2001 || Anderson Mesa || LONEOS || — || align=right | 2.4 km || 
|-id=438 bgcolor=#fefefe
| 68438 ||  || — || September 12, 2001 || Socorro || LINEAR || NYS || align=right | 1.4 km || 
|-id=439 bgcolor=#d6d6d6
| 68439 ||  || — || September 12, 2001 || Socorro || LINEAR || — || align=right | 5.6 km || 
|-id=440 bgcolor=#d6d6d6
| 68440 ||  || — || September 12, 2001 || Socorro || LINEAR || KOR || align=right | 3.4 km || 
|-id=441 bgcolor=#E9E9E9
| 68441 ||  || — || September 12, 2001 || Socorro || LINEAR || — || align=right | 4.5 km || 
|-id=442 bgcolor=#E9E9E9
| 68442 ||  || — || September 12, 2001 || Socorro || LINEAR || — || align=right | 2.7 km || 
|-id=443 bgcolor=#fefefe
| 68443 ||  || — || September 12, 2001 || Socorro || LINEAR || — || align=right | 1.7 km || 
|-id=444 bgcolor=#C2FFFF
| 68444 ||  || — || September 11, 2001 || Socorro || LINEAR || L5 || align=right | 28 km || 
|-id=445 bgcolor=#d6d6d6
| 68445 ||  || — || September 9, 2001 || Anderson Mesa || LONEOS || — || align=right | 8.0 km || 
|-id=446 bgcolor=#fefefe
| 68446 ||  || — || September 10, 2001 || Anderson Mesa || LONEOS || V || align=right | 1.5 km || 
|-id=447 bgcolor=#d6d6d6
| 68447 ||  || — || September 10, 2001 || Anderson Mesa || LONEOS || LIX || align=right | 8.3 km || 
|-id=448 bgcolor=#fefefe
| 68448 Sidneywolff ||  ||  || September 18, 2001 || Fountain Hills || C. W. Juels, P. R. Holvorcem || — || align=right | 2.4 km || 
|-id=449 bgcolor=#E9E9E9
| 68449 ||  || — || September 16, 2001 || Socorro || LINEAR || — || align=right | 3.2 km || 
|-id=450 bgcolor=#E9E9E9
| 68450 ||  || — || September 16, 2001 || Socorro || LINEAR || — || align=right | 1.8 km || 
|-id=451 bgcolor=#d6d6d6
| 68451 ||  || — || September 16, 2001 || Socorro || LINEAR || THM || align=right | 6.9 km || 
|-id=452 bgcolor=#d6d6d6
| 68452 ||  || — || September 16, 2001 || Socorro || LINEAR || KOR || align=right | 3.8 km || 
|-id=453 bgcolor=#d6d6d6
| 68453 ||  || — || September 16, 2001 || Socorro || LINEAR || — || align=right | 5.2 km || 
|-id=454 bgcolor=#E9E9E9
| 68454 ||  || — || September 16, 2001 || Socorro || LINEAR || — || align=right | 2.2 km || 
|-id=455 bgcolor=#fefefe
| 68455 ||  || — || September 16, 2001 || Socorro || LINEAR || — || align=right | 1.5 km || 
|-id=456 bgcolor=#d6d6d6
| 68456 ||  || — || September 16, 2001 || Socorro || LINEAR || — || align=right | 5.0 km || 
|-id=457 bgcolor=#d6d6d6
| 68457 ||  || — || September 17, 2001 || Socorro || LINEAR || THM || align=right | 5.8 km || 
|-id=458 bgcolor=#fefefe
| 68458 ||  || — || September 17, 2001 || Socorro || LINEAR || V || align=right | 1.4 km || 
|-id=459 bgcolor=#E9E9E9
| 68459 ||  || — || September 20, 2001 || Socorro || LINEAR || MRX || align=right | 1.9 km || 
|-id=460 bgcolor=#fefefe
| 68460 ||  || — || September 20, 2001 || Socorro || LINEAR || V || align=right | 1.6 km || 
|-id=461 bgcolor=#d6d6d6
| 68461 ||  || — || September 20, 2001 || Socorro || LINEAR || EOS || align=right | 6.0 km || 
|-id=462 bgcolor=#E9E9E9
| 68462 ||  || — || September 20, 2001 || Socorro || LINEAR || — || align=right | 3.9 km || 
|-id=463 bgcolor=#E9E9E9
| 68463 ||  || — || September 16, 2001 || Socorro || LINEAR || — || align=right | 2.5 km || 
|-id=464 bgcolor=#E9E9E9
| 68464 ||  || — || September 16, 2001 || Socorro || LINEAR || — || align=right | 2.3 km || 
|-id=465 bgcolor=#fefefe
| 68465 ||  || — || September 16, 2001 || Socorro || LINEAR || NYS || align=right | 1.6 km || 
|-id=466 bgcolor=#fefefe
| 68466 ||  || — || September 17, 2001 || Socorro || LINEAR || — || align=right | 2.2 km || 
|-id=467 bgcolor=#E9E9E9
| 68467 ||  || — || September 17, 2001 || Socorro || LINEAR || HNS || align=right | 2.6 km || 
|-id=468 bgcolor=#fefefe
| 68468 ||  || — || September 19, 2001 || Socorro || LINEAR || NYS || align=right | 1.2 km || 
|-id=469 bgcolor=#d6d6d6
| 68469 ||  || — || September 19, 2001 || Socorro || LINEAR || — || align=right | 6.0 km || 
|-id=470 bgcolor=#E9E9E9
| 68470 ||  || — || September 25, 2001 || Desert Eagle || W. K. Y. Yeung || — || align=right | 4.1 km || 
|-id=471 bgcolor=#E9E9E9
| 68471 ||  || — || September 21, 2001 || Palomar || NEAT || — || align=right | 3.6 km || 
|-id=472 bgcolor=#E9E9E9
| 68472 ||  || — || September 28, 2001 || Farpoint || G. Hug || CLO || align=right | 5.8 km || 
|-id=473 bgcolor=#d6d6d6
| 68473 ||  || — || September 23, 2001 || Goodricke-Pigott || R. A. Tucker || HYG || align=right | 5.6 km || 
|-id=474 bgcolor=#fefefe
| 68474 ||  || — || September 19, 2001 || Kitt Peak || Spacewatch || — || align=right | 1.5 km || 
|-id=475 bgcolor=#E9E9E9
| 68475 ||  || — || September 21, 2001 || Socorro || LINEAR || — || align=right | 5.7 km || 
|-id=476 bgcolor=#E9E9E9
| 68476 ||  || — || October 11, 2001 || Socorro || LINEAR || JUN || align=right | 6.0 km || 
|-id=477 bgcolor=#E9E9E9
| 68477 ||  || — || October 13, 2001 || Socorro || LINEAR || — || align=right | 2.8 km || 
|-id=478 bgcolor=#E9E9E9
| 68478 ||  || — || October 14, 2001 || Socorro || LINEAR || — || align=right | 2.1 km || 
|-id=479 bgcolor=#E9E9E9
| 68479 ||  || — || October 14, 2001 || Socorro || LINEAR || — || align=right | 3.1 km || 
|-id=480 bgcolor=#E9E9E9
| 68480 ||  || — || October 15, 2001 || Desert Eagle || W. K. Y. Yeung || MAR || align=right | 2.5 km || 
|-id=481 bgcolor=#E9E9E9
| 68481 ||  || — || October 14, 2001 || Socorro || LINEAR || — || align=right | 2.2 km || 
|-id=482 bgcolor=#fefefe
| 68482 ||  || — || October 14, 2001 || Socorro || LINEAR || — || align=right | 2.2 km || 
|-id=483 bgcolor=#fefefe
| 68483 ||  || — || October 14, 2001 || Kitt Peak || Spacewatch || NYS || align=right | 1.9 km || 
|-id=484 bgcolor=#fefefe
| 68484 ||  || — || October 10, 2001 || Palomar || NEAT || — || align=right | 1.8 km || 
|-id=485 bgcolor=#fefefe
| 68485 ||  || — || October 10, 2001 || Palomar || NEAT || — || align=right | 1.5 km || 
|-id=486 bgcolor=#fefefe
| 68486 ||  || — || October 15, 2001 || Socorro || LINEAR || — || align=right | 2.3 km || 
|-id=487 bgcolor=#E9E9E9
| 68487 ||  || — || October 14, 2001 || Socorro || LINEAR || EUN || align=right | 2.7 km || 
|-id=488 bgcolor=#d6d6d6
| 68488 ||  || — || October 12, 2001 || Haleakala || NEAT || — || align=right | 5.3 km || 
|-id=489 bgcolor=#E9E9E9
| 68489 ||  || — || October 13, 2001 || Anderson Mesa || LONEOS || — || align=right | 2.8 km || 
|-id=490 bgcolor=#fefefe
| 68490 ||  || — || October 15, 2001 || Palomar || NEAT || KLI || align=right | 2.3 km || 
|-id=491 bgcolor=#fefefe
| 68491 ||  || — || October 17, 2001 || Desert Eagle || W. K. Y. Yeung || — || align=right | 1.9 km || 
|-id=492 bgcolor=#d6d6d6
| 68492 ||  || — || October 17, 2001 || Desert Eagle || W. K. Y. Yeung || KOR || align=right | 2.7 km || 
|-id=493 bgcolor=#E9E9E9
| 68493 ||  || — || October 17, 2001 || Socorro || LINEAR || HEN || align=right | 2.9 km || 
|-id=494 bgcolor=#fefefe
| 68494 ||  || — || October 17, 2001 || Socorro || LINEAR || NYS || align=right | 2.0 km || 
|-id=495 bgcolor=#E9E9E9
| 68495 ||  || — || October 17, 2001 || Socorro || LINEAR || GEF || align=right | 3.5 km || 
|-id=496 bgcolor=#E9E9E9
| 68496 ||  || — || October 16, 2001 || Socorro || LINEAR || — || align=right | 6.2 km || 
|-id=497 bgcolor=#d6d6d6
| 68497 ||  || — || October 16, 2001 || Socorro || LINEAR || 7:4 || align=right | 6.9 km || 
|-id=498 bgcolor=#d6d6d6
| 68498 ||  || — || October 16, 2001 || Socorro || LINEAR || — || align=right | 4.2 km || 
|-id=499 bgcolor=#E9E9E9
| 68499 ||  || — || October 16, 2001 || Socorro || LINEAR || MAR || align=right | 2.6 km || 
|-id=500 bgcolor=#d6d6d6
| 68500 ||  || — || October 17, 2001 || Socorro || LINEAR || — || align=right | 5.3 km || 
|}

68501–68600 

|-bgcolor=#fefefe
| 68501 ||  || — || October 17, 2001 || Socorro || LINEAR || — || align=right | 1.7 km || 
|-id=502 bgcolor=#fefefe
| 68502 ||  || — || October 19, 2001 || Socorro || LINEAR || V || align=right | 1.9 km || 
|-id=503 bgcolor=#d6d6d6
| 68503 ||  || — || October 22, 2001 || Socorro || LINEAR || — || align=right | 5.3 km || 
|-id=504 bgcolor=#fefefe
| 68504 ||  || — || October 22, 2001 || Socorro || LINEAR || — || align=right | 2.1 km || 
|-id=505 bgcolor=#fefefe
| 68505 ||  || — || October 22, 2001 || Socorro || LINEAR || — || align=right | 1.4 km || 
|-id=506 bgcolor=#fefefe
| 68506 ||  || — || October 22, 2001 || Socorro || LINEAR || NYS || align=right | 1.6 km || 
|-id=507 bgcolor=#d6d6d6
| 68507 ||  || — || October 22, 2001 || Socorro || LINEAR || — || align=right | 7.8 km || 
|-id=508 bgcolor=#fefefe
| 68508 ||  || — || October 21, 2001 || Socorro || LINEAR || NYS || align=right | 1.9 km || 
|-id=509 bgcolor=#E9E9E9
| 68509 ||  || — || October 21, 2001 || Socorro || LINEAR || — || align=right | 2.2 km || 
|-id=510 bgcolor=#fefefe
| 68510 ||  || — || October 23, 2001 || Socorro || LINEAR || — || align=right | 2.1 km || 
|-id=511 bgcolor=#E9E9E9
| 68511 ||  || — || October 23, 2001 || Socorro || LINEAR || — || align=right | 1.6 km || 
|-id=512 bgcolor=#E9E9E9
| 68512 ||  || — || October 23, 2001 || Socorro || LINEAR || — || align=right | 2.6 km || 
|-id=513 bgcolor=#fefefe
| 68513 ||  || — || October 19, 2001 || Socorro || LINEAR || — || align=right | 3.8 km || 
|-id=514 bgcolor=#E9E9E9
| 68514 ||  || — || October 21, 2001 || Socorro || LINEAR || — || align=right | 4.5 km || 
|-id=515 bgcolor=#d6d6d6
| 68515 ||  || — || October 16, 2001 || Socorro || LINEAR || — || align=right | 4.3 km || 
|-id=516 bgcolor=#d6d6d6
| 68516 ||  || — || October 17, 2001 || Socorro || LINEAR || — || align=right | 4.4 km || 
|-id=517 bgcolor=#d6d6d6
| 68517 ||  || — || October 23, 2001 || Anderson Mesa || LONEOS || — || align=right | 6.7 km || 
|-id=518 bgcolor=#fefefe
| 68518 ||  || — || November 10, 2001 || Socorro || LINEAR || — || align=right | 3.5 km || 
|-id=519 bgcolor=#C2FFFF
| 68519 ||  || — || November 6, 2001 || Palomar || NEAT || L5 || align=right | 28 km || 
|-id=520 bgcolor=#E9E9E9
| 68520 ||  || — || November 9, 2001 || Socorro || LINEAR || — || align=right | 5.0 km || 
|-id=521 bgcolor=#d6d6d6
| 68521 ||  || — || November 9, 2001 || Socorro || LINEAR || KOR || align=right | 2.7 km || 
|-id=522 bgcolor=#E9E9E9
| 68522 ||  || — || November 9, 2001 || Socorro || LINEAR || — || align=right | 2.3 km || 
|-id=523 bgcolor=#fefefe
| 68523 ||  || — || November 9, 2001 || Socorro || LINEAR || — || align=right | 2.0 km || 
|-id=524 bgcolor=#fefefe
| 68524 ||  || — || November 9, 2001 || Socorro || LINEAR || NYS || align=right | 1.7 km || 
|-id=525 bgcolor=#E9E9E9
| 68525 ||  || — || November 9, 2001 || Socorro || LINEAR || — || align=right | 2.2 km || 
|-id=526 bgcolor=#E9E9E9
| 68526 ||  || — || November 9, 2001 || Socorro || LINEAR || RAF || align=right | 4.6 km || 
|-id=527 bgcolor=#fefefe
| 68527 ||  || — || November 10, 2001 || Socorro || LINEAR || FLO || align=right | 1.9 km || 
|-id=528 bgcolor=#d6d6d6
| 68528 ||  || — || November 10, 2001 || Socorro || LINEAR || EOS || align=right | 4.5 km || 
|-id=529 bgcolor=#E9E9E9
| 68529 ||  || — || November 10, 2001 || Socorro || LINEAR || — || align=right | 3.2 km || 
|-id=530 bgcolor=#fefefe
| 68530 ||  || — || November 11, 2001 || Socorro || LINEAR || — || align=right | 2.9 km || 
|-id=531 bgcolor=#E9E9E9
| 68531 ||  || — || November 15, 2001 || Socorro || LINEAR || — || align=right | 4.5 km || 
|-id=532 bgcolor=#E9E9E9
| 68532 ||  || — || November 15, 2001 || Socorro || LINEAR || MAR || align=right | 2.9 km || 
|-id=533 bgcolor=#E9E9E9
| 68533 ||  || — || November 15, 2001 || Socorro || LINEAR || — || align=right | 5.7 km || 
|-id=534 bgcolor=#E9E9E9
| 68534 ||  || — || November 15, 2001 || Socorro || LINEAR || — || align=right | 5.5 km || 
|-id=535 bgcolor=#fefefe
| 68535 ||  || — || November 15, 2001 || Socorro || LINEAR || — || align=right | 2.6 km || 
|-id=536 bgcolor=#fefefe
| 68536 ||  || — || November 12, 2001 || Socorro || LINEAR || V || align=right | 1.9 km || 
|-id=537 bgcolor=#fefefe
| 68537 ||  || — || November 11, 2001 || Anderson Mesa || LONEOS || H || align=right | 1.2 km || 
|-id=538 bgcolor=#E9E9E9
| 68538 ||  || — || November 11, 2001 || Kitt Peak || Spacewatch || MRX || align=right | 2.4 km || 
|-id=539 bgcolor=#fefefe
| 68539 ||  || — || November 17, 2001 || Ondřejov || P. Kušnirák || FLO || align=right | 1.5 km || 
|-id=540 bgcolor=#d6d6d6
| 68540 ||  || — || November 17, 2001 || Socorro || LINEAR || TEL || align=right | 3.5 km || 
|-id=541 bgcolor=#fefefe
| 68541 ||  || — || November 17, 2001 || Socorro || LINEAR || — || align=right | 2.0 km || 
|-id=542 bgcolor=#E9E9E9
| 68542 ||  || — || November 17, 2001 || Jonathan B. Postel || Jonathan B. Postel Obs. || — || align=right | 1.9 km || 
|-id=543 bgcolor=#fefefe
| 68543 ||  || — || November 17, 2001 || Kitt Peak || Spacewatch || — || align=right | 3.1 km || 
|-id=544 bgcolor=#d6d6d6
| 68544 ||  || — || December 9, 2001 || Socorro || LINEAR || — || align=right | 7.6 km || 
|-id=545 bgcolor=#E9E9E9
| 68545 ||  || — || December 9, 2001 || Socorro || LINEAR || EUN || align=right | 3.8 km || 
|-id=546 bgcolor=#E9E9E9
| 68546 ||  || — || December 10, 2001 || Socorro || LINEAR || — || align=right | 4.7 km || 
|-id=547 bgcolor=#fefefe
| 68547 ||  || — || December 11, 2001 || Socorro || LINEAR || H || align=right | 1.6 km || 
|-id=548 bgcolor=#FFC2E0
| 68548 ||  || — || December 13, 2001 || Socorro || LINEAR || APO +1kmPHA || align=right | 1.2 km || 
|-id=549 bgcolor=#fefefe
| 68549 ||  || — || December 10, 2001 || Socorro || LINEAR || — || align=right | 1.9 km || 
|-id=550 bgcolor=#fefefe
| 68550 ||  || — || December 10, 2001 || Socorro || LINEAR || NYS || align=right | 1.5 km || 
|-id=551 bgcolor=#E9E9E9
| 68551 ||  || — || December 10, 2001 || Socorro || LINEAR || — || align=right | 5.6 km || 
|-id=552 bgcolor=#fefefe
| 68552 ||  || — || December 10, 2001 || Socorro || LINEAR || — || align=right | 6.3 km || 
|-id=553 bgcolor=#fefefe
| 68553 ||  || — || December 10, 2001 || Socorro || LINEAR || H || align=right | 1.6 km || 
|-id=554 bgcolor=#fefefe
| 68554 ||  || — || December 11, 2001 || Socorro || LINEAR || — || align=right | 1.8 km || 
|-id=555 bgcolor=#d6d6d6
| 68555 ||  || — || December 11, 2001 || Socorro || LINEAR || — || align=right | 8.3 km || 
|-id=556 bgcolor=#d6d6d6
| 68556 ||  || — || December 10, 2001 || Socorro || LINEAR || — || align=right | 4.6 km || 
|-id=557 bgcolor=#fefefe
| 68557 ||  || — || December 10, 2001 || Socorro || LINEAR || — || align=right | 2.4 km || 
|-id=558 bgcolor=#E9E9E9
| 68558 ||  || — || December 11, 2001 || Socorro || LINEAR || — || align=right | 6.5 km || 
|-id=559 bgcolor=#E9E9E9
| 68559 ||  || — || December 13, 2001 || Socorro || LINEAR || — || align=right | 6.2 km || 
|-id=560 bgcolor=#d6d6d6
| 68560 ||  || — || December 13, 2001 || Socorro || LINEAR || — || align=right | 11 km || 
|-id=561 bgcolor=#E9E9E9
| 68561 ||  || — || December 14, 2001 || Socorro || LINEAR || — || align=right | 3.6 km || 
|-id=562 bgcolor=#fefefe
| 68562 ||  || — || December 14, 2001 || Socorro || LINEAR || NYS || align=right | 2.0 km || 
|-id=563 bgcolor=#fefefe
| 68563 ||  || — || December 11, 2001 || Socorro || LINEAR || — || align=right | 3.7 km || 
|-id=564 bgcolor=#E9E9E9
| 68564 ||  || — || December 11, 2001 || Socorro || LINEAR || — || align=right | 3.1 km || 
|-id=565 bgcolor=#E9E9E9
| 68565 ||  || — || December 15, 2001 || Socorro || LINEAR || — || align=right | 5.7 km || 
|-id=566 bgcolor=#fefefe
| 68566 ||  || — || December 14, 2001 || Socorro || LINEAR || — || align=right | 1.8 km || 
|-id=567 bgcolor=#fefefe
| 68567 ||  || — || December 13, 2001 || Palomar || NEAT || ERI || align=right | 3.6 km || 
|-id=568 bgcolor=#E9E9E9
| 68568 ||  || — || December 9, 2001 || Anderson Mesa || LONEOS || — || align=right | 3.2 km || 
|-id=569 bgcolor=#FA8072
| 68569 ||  || — || December 19, 2001 || Socorro || LINEAR || — || align=right | 2.4 km || 
|-id=570 bgcolor=#fefefe
| 68570 ||  || — || December 23, 2001 || Kingsnake || J. V. McClusky || H || align=right | 1.1 km || 
|-id=571 bgcolor=#fefefe
| 68571 ||  || — || December 17, 2001 || Socorro || LINEAR || — || align=right | 2.7 km || 
|-id=572 bgcolor=#fefefe
| 68572 ||  || — || December 17, 2001 || Socorro || LINEAR || — || align=right | 3.7 km || 
|-id=573 bgcolor=#E9E9E9
| 68573 ||  || — || December 18, 2001 || Socorro || LINEAR || — || align=right | 2.0 km || 
|-id=574 bgcolor=#E9E9E9
| 68574 ||  || — || December 18, 2001 || Socorro || LINEAR || — || align=right | 2.1 km || 
|-id=575 bgcolor=#fefefe
| 68575 ||  || — || December 18, 2001 || Socorro || LINEAR || V || align=right | 2.0 km || 
|-id=576 bgcolor=#fefefe
| 68576 ||  || — || December 18, 2001 || Socorro || LINEAR || FLO || align=right | 2.4 km || 
|-id=577 bgcolor=#E9E9E9
| 68577 ||  || — || December 18, 2001 || Socorro || LINEAR || — || align=right | 2.4 km || 
|-id=578 bgcolor=#fefefe
| 68578 ||  || — || December 18, 2001 || Socorro || LINEAR || — || align=right | 2.2 km || 
|-id=579 bgcolor=#d6d6d6
| 68579 ||  || — || December 18, 2001 || Socorro || LINEAR || — || align=right | 6.9 km || 
|-id=580 bgcolor=#E9E9E9
| 68580 ||  || — || December 17, 2001 || Palomar || NEAT || — || align=right | 2.6 km || 
|-id=581 bgcolor=#E9E9E9
| 68581 ||  || — || December 18, 2001 || Socorro || LINEAR || — || align=right | 3.5 km || 
|-id=582 bgcolor=#E9E9E9
| 68582 ||  || — || December 18, 2001 || Socorro || LINEAR || GEF || align=right | 3.1 km || 
|-id=583 bgcolor=#E9E9E9
| 68583 ||  || — || December 19, 2001 || Socorro || LINEAR || ADE || align=right | 4.2 km || 
|-id=584 bgcolor=#E9E9E9
| 68584 ||  || — || January 8, 2002 || Oizumi || T. Kobayashi || — || align=right | 2.6 km || 
|-id=585 bgcolor=#fefefe
| 68585 ||  || — || January 9, 2002 || Cima Ekar || ADAS || — || align=right | 2.7 km || 
|-id=586 bgcolor=#fefefe
| 68586 ||  || — || January 5, 2002 || Haleakala || NEAT || — || align=right | 1.5 km || 
|-id=587 bgcolor=#E9E9E9
| 68587 ||  || — || January 11, 2002 || Desert Eagle || W. K. Y. Yeung || — || align=right | 2.4 km || 
|-id=588 bgcolor=#fefefe
| 68588 ||  || — || January 11, 2002 || Desert Eagle || W. K. Y. Yeung || NYS || align=right | 2.1 km || 
|-id=589 bgcolor=#fefefe
| 68589 ||  || — || January 11, 2002 || Desert Eagle || W. K. Y. Yeung || NYS || align=right | 4.4 km || 
|-id=590 bgcolor=#fefefe
| 68590 ||  || — || January 12, 2002 || Socorro || LINEAR || H || align=right | 1.6 km || 
|-id=591 bgcolor=#E9E9E9
| 68591 ||  || — || January 8, 2002 || Palomar || NEAT || EUN || align=right | 2.7 km || 
|-id=592 bgcolor=#E9E9E9
| 68592 ||  || — || January 7, 2002 || Anderson Mesa || LONEOS || — || align=right | 4.8 km || 
|-id=593 bgcolor=#fefefe
| 68593 ||  || — || January 7, 2002 || Anderson Mesa || LONEOS || H || align=right | 1.2 km || 
|-id=594 bgcolor=#E9E9E9
| 68594 ||  || — || January 9, 2002 || Socorro || LINEAR || EUN || align=right | 4.0 km || 
|-id=595 bgcolor=#fefefe
| 68595 ||  || — || January 9, 2002 || Socorro || LINEAR || — || align=right | 2.5 km || 
|-id=596 bgcolor=#E9E9E9
| 68596 ||  || — || January 9, 2002 || Socorro || LINEAR || AGN || align=right | 2.6 km || 
|-id=597 bgcolor=#E9E9E9
| 68597 ||  || — || January 9, 2002 || Socorro || LINEAR || — || align=right | 2.0 km || 
|-id=598 bgcolor=#fefefe
| 68598 ||  || — || January 9, 2002 || Socorro || LINEAR || NYS || align=right | 1.8 km || 
|-id=599 bgcolor=#fefefe
| 68599 ||  || — || January 11, 2002 || Socorro || LINEAR || NYS || align=right | 3.1 km || 
|-id=600 bgcolor=#fefefe
| 68600 ||  || — || January 11, 2002 || Socorro || LINEAR || — || align=right | 1.9 km || 
|}

68601–68700 

|-bgcolor=#E9E9E9
| 68601 ||  || — || January 12, 2002 || Socorro || LINEAR || — || align=right | 4.3 km || 
|-id=602 bgcolor=#E9E9E9
| 68602 ||  || — || January 9, 2002 || Socorro || LINEAR || — || align=right | 3.0 km || 
|-id=603 bgcolor=#E9E9E9
| 68603 ||  || — || January 9, 2002 || Socorro || LINEAR || — || align=right | 4.5 km || 
|-id=604 bgcolor=#fefefe
| 68604 ||  || — || January 8, 2002 || Socorro || LINEAR || FLO || align=right | 2.5 km || 
|-id=605 bgcolor=#d6d6d6
| 68605 ||  || — || January 9, 2002 || Socorro || LINEAR || — || align=right | 8.4 km || 
|-id=606 bgcolor=#E9E9E9
| 68606 ||  || — || January 9, 2002 || Socorro || LINEAR || — || align=right | 3.8 km || 
|-id=607 bgcolor=#fefefe
| 68607 ||  || — || January 9, 2002 || Socorro || LINEAR || NYS || align=right | 1.7 km || 
|-id=608 bgcolor=#fefefe
| 68608 ||  || — || January 9, 2002 || Socorro || LINEAR || PHO || align=right | 3.6 km || 
|-id=609 bgcolor=#fefefe
| 68609 ||  || — || January 9, 2002 || Socorro || LINEAR || — || align=right | 1.7 km || 
|-id=610 bgcolor=#E9E9E9
| 68610 ||  || — || January 9, 2002 || Socorro || LINEAR || JUN || align=right | 2.3 km || 
|-id=611 bgcolor=#E9E9E9
| 68611 ||  || — || January 9, 2002 || Socorro || LINEAR || — || align=right | 2.8 km || 
|-id=612 bgcolor=#fefefe
| 68612 ||  || — || January 11, 2002 || Socorro || LINEAR || NYS || align=right | 2.0 km || 
|-id=613 bgcolor=#fefefe
| 68613 ||  || — || January 12, 2002 || Socorro || LINEAR || H || align=right | 1.7 km || 
|-id=614 bgcolor=#E9E9E9
| 68614 ||  || — || January 9, 2002 || Socorro || LINEAR || — || align=right | 2.5 km || 
|-id=615 bgcolor=#d6d6d6
| 68615 ||  || — || January 13, 2002 || Palomar || NEAT || — || align=right | 4.4 km || 
|-id=616 bgcolor=#fefefe
| 68616 ||  || — || January 14, 2002 || Socorro || LINEAR || NYS || align=right | 1.9 km || 
|-id=617 bgcolor=#fefefe
| 68617 ||  || — || January 13, 2002 || Socorro || LINEAR || MAS || align=right | 1.8 km || 
|-id=618 bgcolor=#fefefe
| 68618 ||  || — || January 13, 2002 || Socorro || LINEAR || — || align=right | 1.4 km || 
|-id=619 bgcolor=#fefefe
| 68619 ||  || — || January 13, 2002 || Socorro || LINEAR || — || align=right | 1.4 km || 
|-id=620 bgcolor=#E9E9E9
| 68620 ||  || — || January 14, 2002 || Socorro || LINEAR || — || align=right | 2.2 km || 
|-id=621 bgcolor=#E9E9E9
| 68621 ||  || — || January 10, 2002 || Palomar || NEAT || — || align=right | 5.8 km || 
|-id=622 bgcolor=#fefefe
| 68622 || 2002 BQ || — || January 21, 2002 || Desert Eagle || W. K. Y. Yeung || — || align=right | 2.2 km || 
|-id=623 bgcolor=#E9E9E9
| 68623 ||  || — || January 18, 2002 || Socorro || LINEAR || EUN || align=right | 3.4 km || 
|-id=624 bgcolor=#fefefe
| 68624 ||  || — || January 18, 2002 || Socorro || LINEAR || — || align=right | 1.8 km || 
|-id=625 bgcolor=#fefefe
| 68625 ||  || — || January 19, 2002 || Socorro || LINEAR || EUT || align=right | 1.4 km || 
|-id=626 bgcolor=#E9E9E9
| 68626 ||  || — || January 19, 2002 || Socorro || LINEAR || RAF || align=right | 2.1 km || 
|-id=627 bgcolor=#fefefe
| 68627 ||  || — || January 19, 2002 || Socorro || LINEAR || — || align=right | 2.2 km || 
|-id=628 bgcolor=#fefefe
| 68628 ||  || — || January 21, 2002 || Socorro || LINEAR || NYS || align=right | 1.5 km || 
|-id=629 bgcolor=#E9E9E9
| 68629 ||  || — || January 21, 2002 || Socorro || LINEAR || — || align=right | 4.2 km || 
|-id=630 bgcolor=#E9E9E9
| 68630 ||  || — || January 25, 2002 || Palomar || NEAT || — || align=right | 5.5 km || 
|-id=631 bgcolor=#d6d6d6
| 68631 ||  || — || January 19, 2002 || Anderson Mesa || LONEOS || URS || align=right | 8.3 km || 
|-id=632 bgcolor=#fefefe
| 68632 ||  || — || February 6, 2002 || Fountain Hills || C. W. Juels, P. R. Holvorcem || H || align=right | 1.5 km || 
|-id=633 bgcolor=#fefefe
| 68633 ||  || — || February 8, 2002 || Desert Eagle || W. K. Y. Yeung || NYS || align=right | 3.8 km || 
|-id=634 bgcolor=#fefefe
| 68634 ||  || — || February 9, 2002 || Desert Eagle || W. K. Y. Yeung || NYS || align=right | 1.5 km || 
|-id=635 bgcolor=#E9E9E9
| 68635 ||  || — || February 8, 2002 || Fountain Hills || C. W. Juels, P. R. Holvorcem || — || align=right | 2.0 km || 
|-id=636 bgcolor=#E9E9E9
| 68636 ||  || — || February 6, 2002 || Socorro || LINEAR || — || align=right | 5.3 km || 
|-id=637 bgcolor=#fefefe
| 68637 ||  || — || February 6, 2002 || Socorro || LINEAR || — || align=right | 3.4 km || 
|-id=638 bgcolor=#E9E9E9
| 68638 ||  || — || February 6, 2002 || Socorro || LINEAR || — || align=right | 3.6 km || 
|-id=639 bgcolor=#fefefe
| 68639 ||  || — || February 6, 2002 || Socorro || LINEAR || FLO || align=right | 2.0 km || 
|-id=640 bgcolor=#E9E9E9
| 68640 ||  || — || February 7, 2002 || Socorro || LINEAR || BRU || align=right | 5.0 km || 
|-id=641 bgcolor=#fefefe
| 68641 ||  || — || February 8, 2002 || Socorro || LINEAR || — || align=right | 2.0 km || 
|-id=642 bgcolor=#fefefe
| 68642 ||  || — || February 8, 2002 || Kitt Peak || Spacewatch || — || align=right | 1.9 km || 
|-id=643 bgcolor=#fefefe
| 68643 ||  || — || February 3, 2002 || Haleakala || NEAT || — || align=right | 4.4 km || 
|-id=644 bgcolor=#fefefe
| 68644 ||  || — || February 12, 2002 || Desert Eagle || W. K. Y. Yeung || — || align=right | 1.6 km || 
|-id=645 bgcolor=#fefefe
| 68645 ||  || — || February 11, 2002 || Fountain Hills || C. W. Juels, P. R. Holvorcem || — || align=right | 5.6 km || 
|-id=646 bgcolor=#fefefe
| 68646 ||  || — || February 7, 2002 || Socorro || LINEAR || NYS || align=right | 2.0 km || 
|-id=647 bgcolor=#fefefe
| 68647 ||  || — || February 7, 2002 || Socorro || LINEAR || — || align=right | 1.9 km || 
|-id=648 bgcolor=#fefefe
| 68648 ||  || — || February 7, 2002 || Socorro || LINEAR || — || align=right | 2.6 km || 
|-id=649 bgcolor=#fefefe
| 68649 ||  || — || February 7, 2002 || Socorro || LINEAR || NYS || align=right | 1.5 km || 
|-id=650 bgcolor=#E9E9E9
| 68650 ||  || — || February 13, 2002 || Desert Eagle || W. K. Y. Yeung || — || align=right | 2.0 km || 
|-id=651 bgcolor=#E9E9E9
| 68651 ||  || — || February 6, 2002 || Socorro || LINEAR || — || align=right | 4.5 km || 
|-id=652 bgcolor=#fefefe
| 68652 ||  || — || February 7, 2002 || Socorro || LINEAR || ERI || align=right | 3.4 km || 
|-id=653 bgcolor=#fefefe
| 68653 ||  || — || February 7, 2002 || Socorro || LINEAR || NYS || align=right | 1.4 km || 
|-id=654 bgcolor=#fefefe
| 68654 ||  || — || February 7, 2002 || Socorro || LINEAR || — || align=right | 2.1 km || 
|-id=655 bgcolor=#fefefe
| 68655 ||  || — || February 7, 2002 || Socorro || LINEAR || FLO || align=right | 1.4 km || 
|-id=656 bgcolor=#fefefe
| 68656 ||  || — || February 7, 2002 || Socorro || LINEAR || NYS || align=right | 1.8 km || 
|-id=657 bgcolor=#fefefe
| 68657 ||  || — || February 7, 2002 || Socorro || LINEAR || NYS || align=right | 1.5 km || 
|-id=658 bgcolor=#fefefe
| 68658 ||  || — || February 7, 2002 || Socorro || LINEAR || NYS || align=right | 1.3 km || 
|-id=659 bgcolor=#fefefe
| 68659 ||  || — || February 7, 2002 || Socorro || LINEAR || NYS || align=right | 3.5 km || 
|-id=660 bgcolor=#fefefe
| 68660 ||  || — || February 7, 2002 || Socorro || LINEAR || V || align=right | 1.3 km || 
|-id=661 bgcolor=#fefefe
| 68661 ||  || — || February 7, 2002 || Socorro || LINEAR || — || align=right | 1.5 km || 
|-id=662 bgcolor=#E9E9E9
| 68662 ||  || — || February 7, 2002 || Socorro || LINEAR || — || align=right | 4.7 km || 
|-id=663 bgcolor=#fefefe
| 68663 ||  || — || February 7, 2002 || Socorro || LINEAR || MAS || align=right | 2.0 km || 
|-id=664 bgcolor=#E9E9E9
| 68664 ||  || — || February 7, 2002 || Socorro || LINEAR || — || align=right | 1.9 km || 
|-id=665 bgcolor=#fefefe
| 68665 ||  || — || February 7, 2002 || Socorro || LINEAR || — || align=right | 4.9 km || 
|-id=666 bgcolor=#fefefe
| 68666 ||  || — || February 7, 2002 || Socorro || LINEAR || — || align=right | 3.1 km || 
|-id=667 bgcolor=#fefefe
| 68667 ||  || — || February 7, 2002 || Socorro || LINEAR || NYS || align=right | 2.2 km || 
|-id=668 bgcolor=#fefefe
| 68668 ||  || — || February 7, 2002 || Socorro || LINEAR || — || align=right | 2.3 km || 
|-id=669 bgcolor=#fefefe
| 68669 ||  || — || February 7, 2002 || Socorro || LINEAR || — || align=right | 2.2 km || 
|-id=670 bgcolor=#E9E9E9
| 68670 ||  || — || February 7, 2002 || Socorro || LINEAR || — || align=right | 4.5 km || 
|-id=671 bgcolor=#E9E9E9
| 68671 ||  || — || February 7, 2002 || Socorro || LINEAR || GEF || align=right | 3.8 km || 
|-id=672 bgcolor=#d6d6d6
| 68672 ||  || — || February 8, 2002 || Socorro || LINEAR || — || align=right | 7.1 km || 
|-id=673 bgcolor=#fefefe
| 68673 ||  || — || February 9, 2002 || Socorro || LINEAR || NYS || align=right | 3.1 km || 
|-id=674 bgcolor=#fefefe
| 68674 ||  || — || February 12, 2002 || Desert Eagle || W. K. Y. Yeung || — || align=right | 1.6 km || 
|-id=675 bgcolor=#fefefe
| 68675 ||  || — || February 7, 2002 || Socorro || LINEAR || FLO || align=right | 1.2 km || 
|-id=676 bgcolor=#fefefe
| 68676 ||  || — || February 7, 2002 || Socorro || LINEAR || NYS || align=right | 4.3 km || 
|-id=677 bgcolor=#fefefe
| 68677 ||  || — || February 7, 2002 || Socorro || LINEAR || — || align=right | 4.5 km || 
|-id=678 bgcolor=#fefefe
| 68678 ||  || — || February 7, 2002 || Socorro || LINEAR || — || align=right | 1.8 km || 
|-id=679 bgcolor=#E9E9E9
| 68679 ||  || — || February 7, 2002 || Socorro || LINEAR || — || align=right | 8.1 km || 
|-id=680 bgcolor=#d6d6d6
| 68680 ||  || — || February 7, 2002 || Socorro || LINEAR || — || align=right | 8.1 km || 
|-id=681 bgcolor=#fefefe
| 68681 ||  || — || February 8, 2002 || Socorro || LINEAR || V || align=right | 1.3 km || 
|-id=682 bgcolor=#E9E9E9
| 68682 ||  || — || February 8, 2002 || Socorro || LINEAR || — || align=right | 3.2 km || 
|-id=683 bgcolor=#E9E9E9
| 68683 ||  || — || February 8, 2002 || Socorro || LINEAR || — || align=right | 2.2 km || 
|-id=684 bgcolor=#fefefe
| 68684 ||  || — || February 8, 2002 || Socorro || LINEAR || PHO || align=right | 3.1 km || 
|-id=685 bgcolor=#fefefe
| 68685 ||  || — || February 8, 2002 || Socorro || LINEAR || ERI || align=right | 4.7 km || 
|-id=686 bgcolor=#E9E9E9
| 68686 ||  || — || February 9, 2002 || Socorro || LINEAR || — || align=right | 1.9 km || 
|-id=687 bgcolor=#E9E9E9
| 68687 ||  || — || February 9, 2002 || Socorro || LINEAR || — || align=right | 2.8 km || 
|-id=688 bgcolor=#fefefe
| 68688 ||  || — || February 9, 2002 || Socorro || LINEAR || NYS || align=right | 1.4 km || 
|-id=689 bgcolor=#fefefe
| 68689 ||  || — || February 10, 2002 || Socorro || LINEAR || V || align=right | 1.3 km || 
|-id=690 bgcolor=#d6d6d6
| 68690 ||  || — || February 8, 2002 || Socorro || LINEAR || BRA || align=right | 2.7 km || 
|-id=691 bgcolor=#E9E9E9
| 68691 ||  || — || February 8, 2002 || Socorro || LINEAR || — || align=right | 3.7 km || 
|-id=692 bgcolor=#E9E9E9
| 68692 ||  || — || February 8, 2002 || Socorro || LINEAR || EUN || align=right | 3.7 km || 
|-id=693 bgcolor=#E9E9E9
| 68693 ||  || — || February 8, 2002 || Socorro || LINEAR || — || align=right | 2.5 km || 
|-id=694 bgcolor=#E9E9E9
| 68694 ||  || — || February 8, 2002 || Socorro || LINEAR || — || align=right | 2.8 km || 
|-id=695 bgcolor=#E9E9E9
| 68695 ||  || — || February 8, 2002 || Socorro || LINEAR || — || align=right | 2.3 km || 
|-id=696 bgcolor=#d6d6d6
| 68696 ||  || — || February 8, 2002 || Socorro || LINEAR || — || align=right | 11 km || 
|-id=697 bgcolor=#fefefe
| 68697 ||  || — || February 10, 2002 || Socorro || LINEAR || EUT || align=right | 1.5 km || 
|-id=698 bgcolor=#d6d6d6
| 68698 ||  || — || February 10, 2002 || Socorro || LINEAR || — || align=right | 5.7 km || 
|-id=699 bgcolor=#fefefe
| 68699 ||  || — || February 10, 2002 || Socorro || LINEAR || — || align=right | 2.1 km || 
|-id=700 bgcolor=#E9E9E9
| 68700 ||  || — || February 10, 2002 || Socorro || LINEAR || — || align=right | 2.7 km || 
|}

68701–68800 

|-bgcolor=#fefefe
| 68701 ||  || — || February 10, 2002 || Socorro || LINEAR || NYS || align=right | 1.2 km || 
|-id=702 bgcolor=#fefefe
| 68702 ||  || — || February 10, 2002 || Socorro || LINEAR || NYS || align=right | 3.6 km || 
|-id=703 bgcolor=#fefefe
| 68703 ||  || — || February 10, 2002 || Socorro || LINEAR || V || align=right | 1.3 km || 
|-id=704 bgcolor=#fefefe
| 68704 ||  || — || February 10, 2002 || Socorro || LINEAR || — || align=right | 2.2 km || 
|-id=705 bgcolor=#fefefe
| 68705 ||  || — || February 10, 2002 || Socorro || LINEAR || V || align=right | 1.7 km || 
|-id=706 bgcolor=#d6d6d6
| 68706 ||  || — || February 8, 2002 || Kitt Peak || Spacewatch || 7:4 || align=right | 7.9 km || 
|-id=707 bgcolor=#fefefe
| 68707 ||  || — || February 13, 2002 || Socorro || LINEAR || PHO || align=right | 3.5 km || 
|-id=708 bgcolor=#fefefe
| 68708 ||  || — || February 11, 2002 || Socorro || LINEAR || — || align=right | 1.9 km || 
|-id=709 bgcolor=#fefefe
| 68709 ||  || — || February 11, 2002 || Socorro || LINEAR || — || align=right | 2.0 km || 
|-id=710 bgcolor=#fefefe
| 68710 ||  || — || February 11, 2002 || Socorro || LINEAR || — || align=right | 3.7 km || 
|-id=711 bgcolor=#E9E9E9
| 68711 ||  || — || February 11, 2002 || Socorro || LINEAR || HNS || align=right | 2.6 km || 
|-id=712 bgcolor=#fefefe
| 68712 ||  || — || February 15, 2002 || Socorro || LINEAR || FLO || align=right | 1.8 km || 
|-id=713 bgcolor=#E9E9E9
| 68713 ||  || — || February 4, 2002 || Palomar || NEAT || — || align=right | 4.3 km || 
|-id=714 bgcolor=#fefefe
| 68714 ||  || — || February 6, 2002 || Haleakala || NEAT || — || align=right | 2.1 km || 
|-id=715 bgcolor=#fefefe
| 68715 ||  || — || February 8, 2002 || Anderson Mesa || LONEOS || — || align=right | 1.7 km || 
|-id=716 bgcolor=#fefefe
| 68716 ||  || — || February 8, 2002 || Kitt Peak || M. W. Buie || NYS || align=right | 1.2 km || 
|-id=717 bgcolor=#fefefe
| 68717 ||  || — || February 10, 2002 || Socorro || LINEAR || — || align=right | 1.6 km || 
|-id=718 bgcolor=#E9E9E9
| 68718 Safi || 2002 DQ ||  || February 17, 2002 || Vicques || M. Ory || — || align=right | 2.3 km || 
|-id=719 bgcolor=#fefefe
| 68719 Jangyeongsil || 2002 DW ||  || February 16, 2002 || Bohyunsan || Y.-B. Jeon || SUL || align=right | 4.2 km || 
|-id=720 bgcolor=#E9E9E9
| 68720 ||  || — || February 21, 2002 || Nashville || R. Clingan || DOR || align=right | 5.2 km || 
|-id=721 bgcolor=#E9E9E9
| 68721 ||  || — || February 16, 2002 || Haleakala || NEAT || — || align=right | 5.8 km || 
|-id=722 bgcolor=#d6d6d6
| 68722 ||  || — || February 19, 2002 || Kitt Peak || Spacewatch || — || align=right | 5.4 km || 
|-id=723 bgcolor=#E9E9E9
| 68723 ||  || — || February 20, 2002 || Socorro || LINEAR || — || align=right | 4.7 km || 
|-id=724 bgcolor=#fefefe
| 68724 ||  || — || February 21, 2002 || Palomar || NEAT || H || align=right | 1.4 km || 
|-id=725 bgcolor=#C2FFFF
| 68725 ||  || — || March 10, 2002 || Haleakala || NEAT || L4 || align=right | 18 km || 
|-id=726 bgcolor=#d6d6d6
| 68726 ||  || — || March 12, 2002 || Črni Vrh || Črni Vrh || — || align=right | 7.3 km || 
|-id=727 bgcolor=#fefefe
| 68727 ||  || — || March 12, 2002 || Desert Eagle || W. K. Y. Yeung || NYS || align=right | 2.0 km || 
|-id=728 bgcolor=#fefefe
| 68728 ||  || — || March 6, 2002 || Siding Spring || R. H. McNaught || — || align=right | 1.3 km || 
|-id=729 bgcolor=#fefefe
| 68729 ||  || — || March 14, 2002 || Desert Eagle || W. K. Y. Yeung || — || align=right | 2.2 km || 
|-id=730 bgcolor=#E9E9E9
| 68730 Straizys ||  ||  || March 15, 2002 || Moletai || K. Černis, J. Zdanavičius || — || align=right | 3.0 km || 
|-id=731 bgcolor=#fefefe
| 68731 ||  || — || March 6, 2002 || Socorro || LINEAR || PHO || align=right | 3.1 km || 
|-id=732 bgcolor=#fefefe
| 68732 ||  || — || March 10, 2002 || Haleakala || NEAT || V || align=right | 1.4 km || 
|-id=733 bgcolor=#d6d6d6
| 68733 ||  || — || March 10, 2002 || Anderson Mesa || LONEOS || MEL || align=right | 7.7 km || 
|-id=734 bgcolor=#fefefe
| 68734 ||  || — || March 10, 2002 || Anderson Mesa || LONEOS || V || align=right | 1.5 km || 
|-id=735 bgcolor=#d6d6d6
| 68735 ||  || — || March 10, 2002 || Anderson Mesa || LONEOS || — || align=right | 7.8 km || 
|-id=736 bgcolor=#E9E9E9
| 68736 ||  || — || March 9, 2002 || Socorro || LINEAR || — || align=right | 3.1 km || 
|-id=737 bgcolor=#fefefe
| 68737 ||  || — || March 9, 2002 || Socorro || LINEAR || FLO || align=right | 2.0 km || 
|-id=738 bgcolor=#d6d6d6
| 68738 ||  || — || March 11, 2002 || Haleakala || NEAT || — || align=right | 5.1 km || 
|-id=739 bgcolor=#E9E9E9
| 68739 ||  || — || March 12, 2002 || Kitt Peak || Spacewatch || — || align=right | 4.5 km || 
|-id=740 bgcolor=#fefefe
| 68740 ||  || — || March 12, 2002 || Kitt Peak || Spacewatch || NYS || align=right | 2.7 km || 
|-id=741 bgcolor=#d6d6d6
| 68741 ||  || — || March 9, 2002 || Socorro || LINEAR || — || align=right | 8.0 km || 
|-id=742 bgcolor=#E9E9E9
| 68742 ||  || — || March 12, 2002 || Socorro || LINEAR || — || align=right | 4.4 km || 
|-id=743 bgcolor=#E9E9E9
| 68743 ||  || — || March 12, 2002 || Socorro || LINEAR || — || align=right | 1.8 km || 
|-id=744 bgcolor=#fefefe
| 68744 ||  || — || March 12, 2002 || Socorro || LINEAR || NYS || align=right | 4.1 km || 
|-id=745 bgcolor=#fefefe
| 68745 ||  || — || March 11, 2002 || Palomar || NEAT || — || align=right | 1.9 km || 
|-id=746 bgcolor=#E9E9E9
| 68746 ||  || — || March 11, 2002 || Palomar || NEAT || — || align=right | 1.6 km || 
|-id=747 bgcolor=#fefefe
| 68747 ||  || — || March 12, 2002 || Palomar || NEAT || MAS || align=right | 1.6 km || 
|-id=748 bgcolor=#E9E9E9
| 68748 ||  || — || March 13, 2002 || Socorro || LINEAR || EUN || align=right | 1.9 km || 
|-id=749 bgcolor=#fefefe
| 68749 ||  || — || March 13, 2002 || Socorro || LINEAR || NYS || align=right | 1.7 km || 
|-id=750 bgcolor=#fefefe
| 68750 ||  || — || March 13, 2002 || Socorro || LINEAR || — || align=right | 2.2 km || 
|-id=751 bgcolor=#d6d6d6
| 68751 ||  || — || March 13, 2002 || Socorro || LINEAR || INA || align=right | 6.0 km || 
|-id=752 bgcolor=#fefefe
| 68752 ||  || — || March 13, 2002 || Socorro || LINEAR || — || align=right | 2.0 km || 
|-id=753 bgcolor=#E9E9E9
| 68753 ||  || — || March 13, 2002 || Socorro || LINEAR || — || align=right | 2.2 km || 
|-id=754 bgcolor=#E9E9E9
| 68754 ||  || — || March 14, 2002 || Palomar || NEAT || — || align=right | 2.4 km || 
|-id=755 bgcolor=#fefefe
| 68755 ||  || — || March 10, 2002 || Haleakala || NEAT || V || align=right | 1.7 km || 
|-id=756 bgcolor=#fefefe
| 68756 ||  || — || March 9, 2002 || Socorro || LINEAR || NYS || align=right | 4.2 km || 
|-id=757 bgcolor=#E9E9E9
| 68757 ||  || — || March 9, 2002 || Socorro || LINEAR || — || align=right | 5.5 km || 
|-id=758 bgcolor=#fefefe
| 68758 ||  || — || March 9, 2002 || Socorro || LINEAR || NYS || align=right | 1.8 km || 
|-id=759 bgcolor=#fefefe
| 68759 ||  || — || March 9, 2002 || Socorro || LINEAR || V || align=right | 2.0 km || 
|-id=760 bgcolor=#fefefe
| 68760 ||  || — || March 9, 2002 || Socorro || LINEAR || — || align=right | 2.7 km || 
|-id=761 bgcolor=#fefefe
| 68761 ||  || — || March 12, 2002 || Socorro || LINEAR || — || align=right | 1.9 km || 
|-id=762 bgcolor=#d6d6d6
| 68762 ||  || — || March 14, 2002 || Socorro || LINEAR || TIR || align=right | 6.8 km || 
|-id=763 bgcolor=#E9E9E9
| 68763 ||  || — || March 15, 2002 || Socorro || LINEAR || — || align=right | 4.8 km || 
|-id=764 bgcolor=#fefefe
| 68764 ||  || — || March 15, 2002 || Socorro || LINEAR || — || align=right | 3.0 km || 
|-id=765 bgcolor=#fefefe
| 68765 ||  || — || March 15, 2002 || Socorro || LINEAR || FLO || align=right | 2.2 km || 
|-id=766 bgcolor=#C2FFFF
| 68766 ||  || — || March 6, 2002 || Palomar || NEAT || L4 || align=right | 18 km || 
|-id=767 bgcolor=#fefefe
| 68767 ||  || — || March 9, 2002 || Palomar || NEAT || — || align=right | 2.1 km || 
|-id=768 bgcolor=#E9E9E9
| 68768 ||  || — || March 9, 2002 || Anderson Mesa || LONEOS || — || align=right | 4.8 km || 
|-id=769 bgcolor=#E9E9E9
| 68769 ||  || — || March 9, 2002 || Catalina || CSS || — || align=right | 5.1 km || 
|-id=770 bgcolor=#fefefe
| 68770 ||  || — || March 13, 2002 || Kitt Peak || Spacewatch || MAS || align=right | 1.5 km || 
|-id=771 bgcolor=#fefefe
| 68771 ||  || — || March 12, 2002 || Palomar || NEAT || FLO || align=right | 1.2 km || 
|-id=772 bgcolor=#fefefe
| 68772 ||  || — || March 14, 2002 || Palomar || NEAT || — || align=right | 2.0 km || 
|-id=773 bgcolor=#E9E9E9
| 68773 ||  || — || March 15, 2002 || Palomar || NEAT || — || align=right | 5.7 km || 
|-id=774 bgcolor=#E9E9E9
| 68774 ||  || — || March 15, 2002 || Palomar || NEAT || — || align=right | 3.0 km || 
|-id=775 bgcolor=#E9E9E9
| 68775 ||  || — || March 13, 2002 || Socorro || LINEAR || — || align=right | 4.1 km || 
|-id=776 bgcolor=#E9E9E9
| 68776 ||  || — || March 11, 2002 || Palomar || NEAT || — || align=right | 2.3 km || 
|-id=777 bgcolor=#fefefe
| 68777 ||  || — || March 18, 2002 || Desert Eagle || W. K. Y. Yeung || — || align=right | 2.0 km || 
|-id=778 bgcolor=#fefefe
| 68778 ||  || — || March 19, 2002 || Desert Eagle || W. K. Y. Yeung || — || align=right | 3.8 km || 
|-id=779 bgcolor=#E9E9E9
| 68779 Schöninger ||  ||  || March 18, 2002 || Kleť || KLENOT || — || align=right | 3.4 km || 
|-id=780 bgcolor=#fefefe
| 68780 ||  || — || March 18, 2002 || Desert Eagle || W. K. Y. Yeung || — || align=right | 2.5 km || 
|-id=781 bgcolor=#E9E9E9
| 68781 ||  || — || March 28, 2002 || Haleakala || NEAT || — || align=right | 4.7 km || 
|-id=782 bgcolor=#fefefe
| 68782 ||  || — || March 16, 2002 || Socorro || LINEAR || V || align=right | 1.9 km || 
|-id=783 bgcolor=#fefefe
| 68783 ||  || — || March 16, 2002 || Socorro || LINEAR || — || align=right | 2.2 km || 
|-id=784 bgcolor=#fefefe
| 68784 ||  || — || March 17, 2002 || Socorro || LINEAR || V || align=right | 1.4 km || 
|-id=785 bgcolor=#d6d6d6
| 68785 ||  || — || March 16, 2002 || Haleakala || NEAT || — || align=right | 6.4 km || 
|-id=786 bgcolor=#E9E9E9
| 68786 ||  || — || March 16, 2002 || Socorro || LINEAR || — || align=right | 6.0 km || 
|-id=787 bgcolor=#fefefe
| 68787 ||  || — || March 16, 2002 || Socorro || LINEAR || V || align=right | 2.0 km || 
|-id=788 bgcolor=#C2FFFF
| 68788 ||  || — || March 16, 2002 || Haleakala || NEAT || L4 || align=right | 16 km || 
|-id=789 bgcolor=#E9E9E9
| 68789 ||  || — || March 17, 2002 || Kitt Peak || Spacewatch || — || align=right | 5.4 km || 
|-id=790 bgcolor=#d6d6d6
| 68790 ||  || — || March 20, 2002 || Palomar || NEAT || — || align=right | 4.2 km || 
|-id=791 bgcolor=#d6d6d6
| 68791 ||  || — || March 20, 2002 || Palomar || NEAT || — || align=right | 6.6 km || 
|-id=792 bgcolor=#E9E9E9
| 68792 ||  || — || March 20, 2002 || Socorro || LINEAR || — || align=right | 3.2 km || 
|-id=793 bgcolor=#fefefe
| 68793 ||  || — || April 10, 2002 || Socorro || LINEAR || — || align=right | 2.4 km || 
|-id=794 bgcolor=#E9E9E9
| 68794 ||  || — || April 12, 2002 || Desert Eagle || W. K. Y. Yeung || — || align=right | 3.2 km || 
|-id=795 bgcolor=#fefefe
| 68795 ||  || — || April 15, 2002 || Desert Eagle || W. K. Y. Yeung || FLO || align=right | 1.7 km || 
|-id=796 bgcolor=#d6d6d6
| 68796 ||  || — || April 15, 2002 || Desert Eagle || W. K. Y. Yeung || — || align=right | 7.0 km || 
|-id=797 bgcolor=#E9E9E9
| 68797 ||  || — || April 4, 2002 || Bergisch Gladbach || W. Bickel || — || align=right | 3.2 km || 
|-id=798 bgcolor=#E9E9E9
| 68798 ||  || — || April 15, 2002 || Socorro || LINEAR || — || align=right | 2.4 km || 
|-id=799 bgcolor=#d6d6d6
| 68799 ||  || — || April 15, 2002 || Socorro || LINEAR || HYG || align=right | 5.5 km || 
|-id=800 bgcolor=#fefefe
| 68800 ||  || — || April 14, 2002 || Socorro || LINEAR || FLO || align=right | 2.3 km || 
|}

68801–68900 

|-bgcolor=#fefefe
| 68801 ||  || — || April 14, 2002 || Socorro || LINEAR || V || align=right | 1.9 km || 
|-id=802 bgcolor=#d6d6d6
| 68802 ||  || — || April 14, 2002 || Socorro || LINEAR || THM || align=right | 6.2 km || 
|-id=803 bgcolor=#d6d6d6
| 68803 ||  || — || April 14, 2002 || Socorro || LINEAR || — || align=right | 6.0 km || 
|-id=804 bgcolor=#fefefe
| 68804 ||  || — || April 14, 2002 || Socorro || LINEAR || — || align=right | 2.3 km || 
|-id=805 bgcolor=#d6d6d6
| 68805 ||  || — || April 2, 2002 || Kitt Peak || Spacewatch || — || align=right | 5.9 km || 
|-id=806 bgcolor=#fefefe
| 68806 ||  || — || April 4, 2002 || Palomar || NEAT || — || align=right | 1.6 km || 
|-id=807 bgcolor=#fefefe
| 68807 ||  || — || April 4, 2002 || Palomar || NEAT || — || align=right | 1.8 km || 
|-id=808 bgcolor=#E9E9E9
| 68808 ||  || — || April 5, 2002 || Palomar || NEAT || EUN || align=right | 2.7 km || 
|-id=809 bgcolor=#d6d6d6
| 68809 ||  || — || April 5, 2002 || Palomar || NEAT || — || align=right | 6.5 km || 
|-id=810 bgcolor=#fefefe
| 68810 ||  || — || April 5, 2002 || Palomar || NEAT || V || align=right | 1.6 km || 
|-id=811 bgcolor=#fefefe
| 68811 ||  || — || April 5, 2002 || Palomar || NEAT || V || align=right | 1.8 km || 
|-id=812 bgcolor=#d6d6d6
| 68812 ||  || — || April 5, 2002 || Anderson Mesa || LONEOS || — || align=right | 6.5 km || 
|-id=813 bgcolor=#d6d6d6
| 68813 ||  || — || April 8, 2002 || Palomar || NEAT || — || align=right | 5.3 km || 
|-id=814 bgcolor=#fefefe
| 68814 ||  || — || April 8, 2002 || Palomar || NEAT || — || align=right | 2.4 km || 
|-id=815 bgcolor=#E9E9E9
| 68815 ||  || — || April 8, 2002 || Kitt Peak || Spacewatch || — || align=right | 1.9 km || 
|-id=816 bgcolor=#fefefe
| 68816 ||  || — || April 8, 2002 || Kitt Peak || Spacewatch || — || align=right | 1.8 km || 
|-id=817 bgcolor=#E9E9E9
| 68817 ||  || — || April 8, 2002 || Palomar || NEAT || EUN || align=right | 2.7 km || 
|-id=818 bgcolor=#E9E9E9
| 68818 ||  || — || April 9, 2002 || Anderson Mesa || LONEOS || — || align=right | 3.9 km || 
|-id=819 bgcolor=#fefefe
| 68819 ||  || — || April 9, 2002 || Anderson Mesa || LONEOS || — || align=right | 1.6 km || 
|-id=820 bgcolor=#E9E9E9
| 68820 ||  || — || April 9, 2002 || Anderson Mesa || LONEOS || — || align=right | 4.1 km || 
|-id=821 bgcolor=#d6d6d6
| 68821 ||  || — || April 9, 2002 || Anderson Mesa || LONEOS || — || align=right | 6.0 km || 
|-id=822 bgcolor=#E9E9E9
| 68822 ||  || — || April 9, 2002 || Kitt Peak || Spacewatch || — || align=right | 2.6 km || 
|-id=823 bgcolor=#E9E9E9
| 68823 ||  || — || April 10, 2002 || Socorro || LINEAR || — || align=right | 2.0 km || 
|-id=824 bgcolor=#fefefe
| 68824 ||  || — || April 10, 2002 || Socorro || LINEAR || V || align=right | 1.7 km || 
|-id=825 bgcolor=#fefefe
| 68825 ||  || — || April 10, 2002 || Socorro || LINEAR || FLO || align=right | 1.8 km || 
|-id=826 bgcolor=#d6d6d6
| 68826 ||  || — || April 10, 2002 || Socorro || LINEAR || — || align=right | 5.6 km || 
|-id=827 bgcolor=#E9E9E9
| 68827 ||  || — || April 10, 2002 || Socorro || LINEAR || EUN || align=right | 2.5 km || 
|-id=828 bgcolor=#d6d6d6
| 68828 ||  || — || April 10, 2002 || Socorro || LINEAR || CHA || align=right | 4.1 km || 
|-id=829 bgcolor=#E9E9E9
| 68829 ||  || — || April 10, 2002 || Socorro || LINEAR || — || align=right | 5.0 km || 
|-id=830 bgcolor=#E9E9E9
| 68830 ||  || — || April 10, 2002 || Socorro || LINEAR || — || align=right | 4.8 km || 
|-id=831 bgcolor=#E9E9E9
| 68831 ||  || — || April 10, 2002 || Palomar || NEAT || — || align=right | 3.7 km || 
|-id=832 bgcolor=#E9E9E9
| 68832 ||  || — || April 9, 2002 || Socorro || LINEAR || — || align=right | 4.1 km || 
|-id=833 bgcolor=#fefefe
| 68833 ||  || — || April 10, 2002 || Socorro || LINEAR || — || align=right | 2.3 km || 
|-id=834 bgcolor=#d6d6d6
| 68834 ||  || — || April 10, 2002 || Socorro || LINEAR || — || align=right | 8.1 km || 
|-id=835 bgcolor=#E9E9E9
| 68835 ||  || — || April 11, 2002 || Anderson Mesa || LONEOS || — || align=right | 5.7 km || 
|-id=836 bgcolor=#fefefe
| 68836 ||  || — || April 11, 2002 || Anderson Mesa || LONEOS || — || align=right | 4.4 km || 
|-id=837 bgcolor=#E9E9E9
| 68837 ||  || — || April 11, 2002 || Palomar || NEAT || — || align=right | 2.7 km || 
|-id=838 bgcolor=#fefefe
| 68838 ||  || — || April 11, 2002 || Socorro || LINEAR || — || align=right | 1.9 km || 
|-id=839 bgcolor=#fefefe
| 68839 ||  || — || April 11, 2002 || Socorro || LINEAR || — || align=right | 2.3 km || 
|-id=840 bgcolor=#fefefe
| 68840 ||  || — || April 11, 2002 || Socorro || LINEAR || V || align=right | 1.2 km || 
|-id=841 bgcolor=#E9E9E9
| 68841 ||  || — || April 12, 2002 || Palomar || NEAT || — || align=right | 3.8 km || 
|-id=842 bgcolor=#fefefe
| 68842 ||  || — || April 10, 2002 || Socorro || LINEAR || V || align=right | 1.6 km || 
|-id=843 bgcolor=#fefefe
| 68843 ||  || — || April 12, 2002 || Socorro || LINEAR || — || align=right | 1.9 km || 
|-id=844 bgcolor=#E9E9E9
| 68844 ||  || — || April 12, 2002 || Socorro || LINEAR || — || align=right | 2.1 km || 
|-id=845 bgcolor=#d6d6d6
| 68845 ||  || — || April 12, 2002 || Socorro || LINEAR || — || align=right | 4.2 km || 
|-id=846 bgcolor=#fefefe
| 68846 ||  || — || April 12, 2002 || Palomar || NEAT || NYS || align=right | 3.0 km || 
|-id=847 bgcolor=#fefefe
| 68847 ||  || — || April 13, 2002 || Palomar || NEAT || V || align=right | 1.9 km || 
|-id=848 bgcolor=#fefefe
| 68848 ||  || — || April 13, 2002 || Palomar || NEAT || — || align=right | 2.5 km || 
|-id=849 bgcolor=#d6d6d6
| 68849 ||  || — || April 15, 2002 || Anderson Mesa || LONEOS || EOS || align=right | 4.1 km || 
|-id=850 bgcolor=#E9E9E9
| 68850 ||  || — || April 14, 2002 || Palomar || NEAT || — || align=right | 2.4 km || 
|-id=851 bgcolor=#d6d6d6
| 68851 || 2002 HV || — || April 16, 2002 || Desert Eagle || W. K. Y. Yeung || — || align=right | 8.0 km || 
|-id=852 bgcolor=#E9E9E9
| 68852 ||  || — || April 16, 2002 || Socorro || LINEAR || GEF || align=right | 2.8 km || 
|-id=853 bgcolor=#E9E9E9
| 68853 Vaimaca ||  ||  || April 19, 2002 || Los Molinos || Los Molinos Obs. || — || align=right | 5.7 km || 
|-id=854 bgcolor=#E9E9E9
| 68854 ||  || — || April 17, 2002 || Socorro || LINEAR || — || align=right | 5.9 km || 
|-id=855 bgcolor=#E9E9E9
| 68855 ||  || — || April 29, 2002 || Palomar || NEAT || — || align=right | 2.1 km || 
|-id=856 bgcolor=#d6d6d6
| 68856 ||  || — || April 17, 2002 || Socorro || LINEAR || — || align=right | 4.4 km || 
|-id=857 bgcolor=#fefefe
| 68857 || 2002 JF || — || May 3, 2002 || Desert Eagle || W. K. Y. Yeung || — || align=right | 1.9 km || 
|-id=858 bgcolor=#d6d6d6
| 68858 || 2002 JW || — || May 3, 2002 || Desert Eagle || W. K. Y. Yeung || EOS || align=right | 4.4 km || 
|-id=859 bgcolor=#d6d6d6
| 68859 || 2002 JZ || — || May 3, 2002 || Desert Eagle || W. K. Y. Yeung || EOS || align=right | 3.9 km || 
|-id=860 bgcolor=#E9E9E9
| 68860 ||  || — || May 4, 2002 || Palomar || NEAT || EUN || align=right | 3.2 km || 
|-id=861 bgcolor=#d6d6d6
| 68861 ||  || — || May 3, 2002 || Anderson Mesa || LONEOS || — || align=right | 7.8 km || 
|-id=862 bgcolor=#E9E9E9
| 68862 ||  || — || May 5, 2002 || Palomar || NEAT || — || align=right | 2.4 km || 
|-id=863 bgcolor=#d6d6d6
| 68863 ||  || — || May 6, 2002 || Kitt Peak || Spacewatch || — || align=right | 6.6 km || 
|-id=864 bgcolor=#d6d6d6
| 68864 ||  || — || May 6, 2002 || Socorro || LINEAR || ALA || align=right | 6.4 km || 
|-id=865 bgcolor=#E9E9E9
| 68865 ||  || — || May 8, 2002 || Socorro || LINEAR || — || align=right | 3.4 km || 
|-id=866 bgcolor=#d6d6d6
| 68866 ||  || — || May 8, 2002 || Socorro || LINEAR || EOS || align=right | 4.5 km || 
|-id=867 bgcolor=#E9E9E9
| 68867 ||  || — || May 7, 2002 || Palomar || NEAT || HNS || align=right | 4.6 km || 
|-id=868 bgcolor=#d6d6d6
| 68868 ||  || — || May 8, 2002 || Socorro || LINEAR || — || align=right | 5.9 km || 
|-id=869 bgcolor=#fefefe
| 68869 ||  || — || May 8, 2002 || Socorro || LINEAR || V || align=right | 1.7 km || 
|-id=870 bgcolor=#E9E9E9
| 68870 ||  || — || May 8, 2002 || Socorro || LINEAR || — || align=right | 4.3 km || 
|-id=871 bgcolor=#E9E9E9
| 68871 ||  || — || May 9, 2002 || Socorro || LINEAR || — || align=right | 2.4 km || 
|-id=872 bgcolor=#E9E9E9
| 68872 ||  || — || May 4, 2002 || Anderson Mesa || LONEOS || — || align=right | 3.7 km || 
|-id=873 bgcolor=#E9E9E9
| 68873 ||  || — || May 9, 2002 || Anderson Mesa || LONEOS || — || align=right | 3.4 km || 
|-id=874 bgcolor=#d6d6d6
| 68874 ||  || — || May 8, 2002 || Haleakala || NEAT || — || align=right | 6.2 km || 
|-id=875 bgcolor=#fefefe
| 68875 ||  || — || May 8, 2002 || Socorro || LINEAR || — || align=right | 3.0 km || 
|-id=876 bgcolor=#d6d6d6
| 68876 ||  || — || May 8, 2002 || Socorro || LINEAR || — || align=right | 5.0 km || 
|-id=877 bgcolor=#d6d6d6
| 68877 ||  || — || May 8, 2002 || Socorro || LINEAR || — || align=right | 8.2 km || 
|-id=878 bgcolor=#E9E9E9
| 68878 ||  || — || May 9, 2002 || Socorro || LINEAR || — || align=right | 7.2 km || 
|-id=879 bgcolor=#fefefe
| 68879 ||  || — || May 9, 2002 || Socorro || LINEAR || V || align=right | 2.0 km || 
|-id=880 bgcolor=#d6d6d6
| 68880 ||  || — || May 9, 2002 || Socorro || LINEAR || EOS || align=right | 4.4 km || 
|-id=881 bgcolor=#d6d6d6
| 68881 ||  || — || May 9, 2002 || Socorro || LINEAR || — || align=right | 5.2 km || 
|-id=882 bgcolor=#d6d6d6
| 68882 ||  || — || May 10, 2002 || Socorro || LINEAR || HYG || align=right | 5.3 km || 
|-id=883 bgcolor=#E9E9E9
| 68883 ||  || — || May 10, 2002 || Palomar || NEAT || — || align=right | 5.0 km || 
|-id=884 bgcolor=#d6d6d6
| 68884 ||  || — || May 8, 2002 || Socorro || LINEAR || — || align=right | 6.2 km || 
|-id=885 bgcolor=#fefefe
| 68885 ||  || — || May 8, 2002 || Socorro || LINEAR || V || align=right | 1.6 km || 
|-id=886 bgcolor=#E9E9E9
| 68886 ||  || — || May 8, 2002 || Socorro || LINEAR || — || align=right | 5.8 km || 
|-id=887 bgcolor=#d6d6d6
| 68887 ||  || — || May 8, 2002 || Socorro || LINEAR || — || align=right | 6.3 km || 
|-id=888 bgcolor=#d6d6d6
| 68888 ||  || — || May 8, 2002 || Socorro || LINEAR || — || align=right | 8.1 km || 
|-id=889 bgcolor=#d6d6d6
| 68889 ||  || — || May 8, 2002 || Socorro || LINEAR || — || align=right | 8.2 km || 
|-id=890 bgcolor=#E9E9E9
| 68890 ||  || — || May 11, 2002 || Socorro || LINEAR || MAR || align=right | 1.9 km || 
|-id=891 bgcolor=#d6d6d6
| 68891 ||  || — || May 11, 2002 || Socorro || LINEAR || THM || align=right | 4.8 km || 
|-id=892 bgcolor=#fefefe
| 68892 ||  || — || May 11, 2002 || Socorro || LINEAR || — || align=right | 4.7 km || 
|-id=893 bgcolor=#d6d6d6
| 68893 ||  || — || May 11, 2002 || Socorro || LINEAR || KOR || align=right | 3.2 km || 
|-id=894 bgcolor=#fefefe
| 68894 ||  || — || May 11, 2002 || Socorro || LINEAR || — || align=right | 2.3 km || 
|-id=895 bgcolor=#fefefe
| 68895 ||  || — || May 11, 2002 || Socorro || LINEAR || V || align=right | 1.9 km || 
|-id=896 bgcolor=#d6d6d6
| 68896 ||  || — || May 11, 2002 || Socorro || LINEAR || — || align=right | 7.9 km || 
|-id=897 bgcolor=#E9E9E9
| 68897 ||  || — || May 11, 2002 || Socorro || LINEAR || DOR || align=right | 6.5 km || 
|-id=898 bgcolor=#fefefe
| 68898 ||  || — || May 11, 2002 || Socorro || LINEAR || NYS || align=right | 4.3 km || 
|-id=899 bgcolor=#d6d6d6
| 68899 ||  || — || May 11, 2002 || Socorro || LINEAR || THM || align=right | 4.7 km || 
|-id=900 bgcolor=#d6d6d6
| 68900 ||  || — || May 8, 2002 || Socorro || LINEAR || 7:4 || align=right | 10 km || 
|}

68901–69000 

|-bgcolor=#E9E9E9
| 68901 ||  || — || May 15, 2002 || Fountain Hills || Fountain Hills Obs. || EUN || align=right | 2.3 km || 
|-id=902 bgcolor=#E9E9E9
| 68902 ||  || — || May 6, 2002 || Socorro || LINEAR || HNS || align=right | 2.8 km || 
|-id=903 bgcolor=#d6d6d6
| 68903 ||  || — || May 6, 2002 || Socorro || LINEAR || ALA || align=right | 5.8 km || 
|-id=904 bgcolor=#d6d6d6
| 68904 ||  || — || May 10, 2002 || Socorro || LINEAR || — || align=right | 6.2 km || 
|-id=905 bgcolor=#fefefe
| 68905 ||  || — || May 12, 2002 || Socorro || LINEAR || FLO || align=right | 1.9 km || 
|-id=906 bgcolor=#E9E9E9
| 68906 ||  || — || May 13, 2002 || Palomar || NEAT || — || align=right | 4.7 km || 
|-id=907 bgcolor=#d6d6d6
| 68907 ||  || — || May 11, 2002 || Socorro || LINEAR || — || align=right | 4.9 km || 
|-id=908 bgcolor=#d6d6d6
| 68908 ||  || — || May 4, 2002 || Anderson Mesa || LONEOS || EOS || align=right | 4.7 km || 
|-id=909 bgcolor=#E9E9E9
| 68909 ||  || — || May 5, 2002 || Palomar || NEAT || INO || align=right | 2.2 km || 
|-id=910 bgcolor=#E9E9E9
| 68910 ||  || — || May 5, 2002 || Palomar || NEAT || — || align=right | 4.9 km || 
|-id=911 bgcolor=#d6d6d6
| 68911 ||  || — || May 5, 2002 || Palomar || NEAT || — || align=right | 6.4 km || 
|-id=912 bgcolor=#d6d6d6
| 68912 ||  || — || May 6, 2002 || Anderson Mesa || LONEOS || BRA || align=right | 4.2 km || 
|-id=913 bgcolor=#E9E9E9
| 68913 ||  || — || May 8, 2002 || Anderson Mesa || LONEOS || — || align=right | 2.9 km || 
|-id=914 bgcolor=#E9E9E9
| 68914 ||  || — || May 9, 2002 || Palomar || NEAT || — || align=right | 2.4 km || 
|-id=915 bgcolor=#d6d6d6
| 68915 ||  || — || May 30, 2002 || Palomar || NEAT || — || align=right | 4.1 km || 
|-id=916 bgcolor=#d6d6d6
| 68916 ||  || — || May 16, 2002 || Socorro || LINEAR || — || align=right | 5.3 km || 
|-id=917 bgcolor=#E9E9E9
| 68917 ||  || — || May 16, 2002 || Socorro || LINEAR || — || align=right | 4.8 km || 
|-id=918 bgcolor=#fefefe
| 68918 ||  || — || May 16, 2002 || Socorro || LINEAR || V || align=right | 1.8 km || 
|-id=919 bgcolor=#d6d6d6
| 68919 ||  || — || June 3, 2002 || Socorro || LINEAR || ALA || align=right | 9.1 km || 
|-id=920 bgcolor=#E9E9E9
| 68920 ||  || — || June 3, 2002 || Socorro || LINEAR || — || align=right | 3.9 km || 
|-id=921 bgcolor=#d6d6d6
| 68921 ||  || — || June 1, 2002 || Palomar || NEAT || — || align=right | 6.9 km || 
|-id=922 bgcolor=#d6d6d6
| 68922 ||  || — || June 5, 2002 || Socorro || LINEAR || 7:4 || align=right | 13 km || 
|-id=923 bgcolor=#d6d6d6
| 68923 ||  || — || June 10, 2002 || Socorro || LINEAR || TIR || align=right | 7.1 km || 
|-id=924 bgcolor=#d6d6d6
| 68924 ||  || — || June 12, 2002 || Socorro || LINEAR || — || align=right | 5.8 km || 
|-id=925 bgcolor=#E9E9E9
| 68925 ||  || — || June 8, 2002 || Socorro || LINEAR || — || align=right | 3.5 km || 
|-id=926 bgcolor=#d6d6d6
| 68926 ||  || — || June 19, 2002 || Kitt Peak || Spacewatch || — || align=right | 7.1 km || 
|-id=927 bgcolor=#d6d6d6
| 68927 ||  || — || July 13, 2002 || Socorro || LINEAR || EOS || align=right | 6.1 km || 
|-id=928 bgcolor=#d6d6d6
| 68928 ||  || — || July 13, 2002 || Socorro || LINEAR || EOS || align=right | 5.5 km || 
|-id=929 bgcolor=#E9E9E9
| 68929 ||  || — || July 17, 2002 || Socorro || LINEAR || — || align=right | 3.4 km || 
|-id=930 bgcolor=#E9E9E9
| 68930 ||  || — || July 17, 2002 || Socorro || LINEAR || — || align=right | 3.1 km || 
|-id=931 bgcolor=#E9E9E9
| 68931 ||  || — || July 18, 2002 || Palomar || NEAT || — || align=right | 2.5 km || 
|-id=932 bgcolor=#d6d6d6
| 68932 ||  || — || July 18, 2002 || Socorro || LINEAR || — || align=right | 6.4 km || 
|-id=933 bgcolor=#d6d6d6
| 68933 ||  || — || July 28, 2002 || Haleakala || NEAT || 3:2 || align=right | 12 km || 
|-id=934 bgcolor=#d6d6d6
| 68934 ||  || — || August 6, 2002 || Palomar || NEAT || — || align=right | 7.0 km || 
|-id=935 bgcolor=#E9E9E9
| 68935 ||  || — || August 6, 2002 || Palomar || NEAT || — || align=right | 3.9 km || 
|-id=936 bgcolor=#E9E9E9
| 68936 ||  || — || August 9, 2002 || Socorro || LINEAR || ADE || align=right | 5.3 km || 
|-id=937 bgcolor=#E9E9E9
| 68937 ||  || — || August 10, 2002 || Socorro || LINEAR || — || align=right | 6.7 km || 
|-id=938 bgcolor=#fefefe
| 68938 ||  || — || August 10, 2002 || Socorro || LINEAR || NYS || align=right | 1.5 km || 
|-id=939 bgcolor=#d6d6d6
| 68939 ||  || — || August 12, 2002 || Socorro || LINEAR || — || align=right | 6.8 km || 
|-id=940 bgcolor=#d6d6d6
| 68940 ||  || — || August 13, 2002 || Socorro || LINEAR || — || align=right | 8.8 km || 
|-id=941 bgcolor=#E9E9E9
| 68941 ||  || — || August 13, 2002 || Anderson Mesa || LONEOS || — || align=right | 4.1 km || 
|-id=942 bgcolor=#d6d6d6
| 68942 ||  || — || August 14, 2002 || Socorro || LINEAR || KOR || align=right | 3.3 km || 
|-id=943 bgcolor=#fefefe
| 68943 ||  || — || August 14, 2002 || Socorro || LINEAR || — || align=right | 2.5 km || 
|-id=944 bgcolor=#fefefe
| 68944 ||  || — || August 15, 2002 || Socorro || LINEAR || — || align=right | 7.1 km || 
|-id=945 bgcolor=#d6d6d6
| 68945 ||  || — || August 14, 2002 || Socorro || LINEAR || HYG || align=right | 7.4 km || 
|-id=946 bgcolor=#fefefe
| 68946 ||  || — || August 11, 2002 || Haleakala || NEAT || — || align=right | 2.8 km || 
|-id=947 bgcolor=#E9E9E9
| 68947 Brunofunk ||  ||  || August 8, 2002 || Palomar || S. F. Hönig || AGN || align=right | 2.2 km || 
|-id=948 bgcolor=#E9E9E9
| 68948 Mikeoates ||  ||  || August 8, 2002 || Palomar || S. F. Hönig || — || align=right | 3.8 km || 
|-id=949 bgcolor=#E9E9E9
| 68949 ||  || — || August 19, 2002 || Kvistaberg || UDAS || — || align=right | 2.3 km || 
|-id=950 bgcolor=#FFC2E0
| 68950 ||  || — || August 27, 2002 || Socorro || LINEAR || APO +1kmPHA || align=right | 1.7 km || 
|-id=951 bgcolor=#fefefe
| 68951 ||  || — || August 28, 2002 || Palomar || NEAT || — || align=right | 3.0 km || 
|-id=952 bgcolor=#E9E9E9
| 68952 ||  || — || August 29, 2002 || Palomar || NEAT || — || align=right | 4.4 km || 
|-id=953 bgcolor=#d6d6d6
| 68953 || 2002 RS || — || September 3, 2002 || Nashville || R. Clingan || THM || align=right | 6.3 km || 
|-id=954 bgcolor=#fefefe
| 68954 ||  || — || September 4, 2002 || Anderson Mesa || LONEOS || — || align=right | 5.5 km || 
|-id=955 bgcolor=#d6d6d6
| 68955 ||  || — || September 4, 2002 || Anderson Mesa || LONEOS || THM || align=right | 6.1 km || 
|-id=956 bgcolor=#d6d6d6
| 68956 ||  || — || September 4, 2002 || Anderson Mesa || LONEOS || — || align=right | 6.6 km || 
|-id=957 bgcolor=#fefefe
| 68957 ||  || — || September 4, 2002 || Anderson Mesa || LONEOS || ERI || align=right | 3.9 km || 
|-id=958 bgcolor=#fefefe
| 68958 ||  || — || September 4, 2002 || Anderson Mesa || LONEOS || — || align=right | 1.8 km || 
|-id=959 bgcolor=#fefefe
| 68959 ||  || — || September 5, 2002 || Socorro || LINEAR || MAS || align=right | 2.1 km || 
|-id=960 bgcolor=#fefefe
| 68960 ||  || — || September 5, 2002 || Socorro || LINEAR || V || align=right | 1.6 km || 
|-id=961 bgcolor=#E9E9E9
| 68961 ||  || — || September 5, 2002 || Socorro || LINEAR || — || align=right | 4.0 km || 
|-id=962 bgcolor=#E9E9E9
| 68962 ||  || — || September 5, 2002 || Socorro || LINEAR || — || align=right | 3.6 km || 
|-id=963 bgcolor=#fefefe
| 68963 ||  || — || September 5, 2002 || Socorro || LINEAR || — || align=right | 1.6 km || 
|-id=964 bgcolor=#E9E9E9
| 68964 ||  || — || September 5, 2002 || Socorro || LINEAR || — || align=right | 3.2 km || 
|-id=965 bgcolor=#d6d6d6
| 68965 ||  || — || September 5, 2002 || Socorro || LINEAR || KOR || align=right | 3.9 km || 
|-id=966 bgcolor=#fefefe
| 68966 ||  || — || September 5, 2002 || Socorro || LINEAR || — || align=right | 1.5 km || 
|-id=967 bgcolor=#E9E9E9
| 68967 ||  || — || September 5, 2002 || Socorro || LINEAR || PAD || align=right | 4.6 km || 
|-id=968 bgcolor=#E9E9E9
| 68968 ||  || — || September 5, 2002 || Socorro || LINEAR || — || align=right | 1.9 km || 
|-id=969 bgcolor=#E9E9E9
| 68969 ||  || — || September 5, 2002 || Socorro || LINEAR || — || align=right | 2.2 km || 
|-id=970 bgcolor=#E9E9E9
| 68970 ||  || — || September 5, 2002 || Socorro || LINEAR || MRX || align=right | 2.4 km || 
|-id=971 bgcolor=#fefefe
| 68971 ||  || — || September 5, 2002 || Socorro || LINEAR || FLO || align=right | 1.3 km || 
|-id=972 bgcolor=#E9E9E9
| 68972 ||  || — || September 5, 2002 || Socorro || LINEAR || — || align=right | 2.2 km || 
|-id=973 bgcolor=#E9E9E9
| 68973 ||  || — || September 5, 2002 || Socorro || LINEAR || GEF || align=right | 3.9 km || 
|-id=974 bgcolor=#E9E9E9
| 68974 ||  || — || September 5, 2002 || Socorro || LINEAR || — || align=right | 2.0 km || 
|-id=975 bgcolor=#d6d6d6
| 68975 ||  || — || September 5, 2002 || Socorro || LINEAR || — || align=right | 5.6 km || 
|-id=976 bgcolor=#fefefe
| 68976 ||  || — || September 6, 2002 || Socorro || LINEAR || — || align=right | 1.3 km || 
|-id=977 bgcolor=#E9E9E9
| 68977 ||  || — || September 10, 2002 || Palomar || NEAT || — || align=right | 4.2 km || 
|-id=978 bgcolor=#fefefe
| 68978 ||  || — || September 10, 2002 || Palomar || NEAT || — || align=right | 1.9 km || 
|-id=979 bgcolor=#E9E9E9
| 68979 ||  || — || September 13, 2002 || Socorro || LINEAR || EUN || align=right | 3.1 km || 
|-id=980 bgcolor=#d6d6d6
| 68980 ||  || — || September 13, 2002 || Starkenburg Observatory || Starkenburg Obs. || — || align=right | 7.2 km || 
|-id=981 bgcolor=#E9E9E9
| 68981 ||  || — || September 29, 2002 || Haleakala || NEAT || — || align=right | 2.5 km || 
|-id=982 bgcolor=#fefefe
| 68982 ||  || — || September 28, 2002 || Haleakala || NEAT || V || align=right | 2.4 km || 
|-id=983 bgcolor=#fefefe
| 68983 ||  || — || September 30, 2002 || Haleakala || NEAT || — || align=right | 2.1 km || 
|-id=984 bgcolor=#d6d6d6
| 68984 ||  || — || September 30, 2002 || Socorro || LINEAR || — || align=right | 4.3 km || 
|-id=985 bgcolor=#d6d6d6
| 68985 ||  || — || October 2, 2002 || Socorro || LINEAR || — || align=right | 7.2 km || 
|-id=986 bgcolor=#d6d6d6
| 68986 ||  || — || October 2, 2002 || Socorro || LINEAR || KOR || align=right | 3.2 km || 
|-id=987 bgcolor=#d6d6d6
| 68987 ||  || — || October 2, 2002 || Socorro || LINEAR || — || align=right | 4.1 km || 
|-id=988 bgcolor=#d6d6d6
| 68988 ||  || — || October 2, 2002 || Socorro || LINEAR || THM || align=right | 6.3 km || 
|-id=989 bgcolor=#E9E9E9
| 68989 ||  || — || October 2, 2002 || Socorro || LINEAR || MIS || align=right | 5.2 km || 
|-id=990 bgcolor=#d6d6d6
| 68990 ||  || — || October 2, 2002 || Socorro || LINEAR || — || align=right | 6.5 km || 
|-id=991 bgcolor=#d6d6d6
| 68991 ||  || — || October 2, 2002 || Socorro || LINEAR || EOS || align=right | 4.6 km || 
|-id=992 bgcolor=#d6d6d6
| 68992 ||  || — || October 2, 2002 || Socorro || LINEAR || BRA || align=right | 4.1 km || 
|-id=993 bgcolor=#E9E9E9
| 68993 ||  || — || October 3, 2002 || Palomar || NEAT || — || align=right | 4.4 km || 
|-id=994 bgcolor=#fefefe
| 68994 ||  || — || October 3, 2002 || Palomar || NEAT || — || align=right | 2.6 km || 
|-id=995 bgcolor=#d6d6d6
| 68995 ||  || — || October 3, 2002 || Socorro || LINEAR || — || align=right | 4.8 km || 
|-id=996 bgcolor=#fefefe
| 68996 ||  || — || October 4, 2002 || Socorro || LINEAR || V || align=right | 2.6 km || 
|-id=997 bgcolor=#d6d6d6
| 68997 ||  || — || October 4, 2002 || Anderson Mesa || LONEOS || NAE || align=right | 11 km || 
|-id=998 bgcolor=#d6d6d6
| 68998 ||  || — || October 5, 2002 || Palomar || NEAT || URS || align=right | 7.9 km || 
|-id=999 bgcolor=#E9E9E9
| 68999 ||  || — || October 5, 2002 || Palomar || NEAT || — || align=right | 2.8 km || 
|-id=000 bgcolor=#E9E9E9
| 69000 ||  || — || October 4, 2002 || Socorro || LINEAR || — || align=right | 4.2 km || 
|}

References

External links 
 Discovery Circumstances: Numbered Minor Planets (65001)–(70000) (IAU Minor Planet Center)

0068